= List of high schools in New York City =

This is a list of high schools in New York City.

== All boroughs ==
=== The Bronx ===
School	P.S. number	Type	Religious affiliation	Website	
School	P.S. number	Type	Religious affiliation	NYC DOE	School
Academy for Language and Technology	X365	Public			
Academy for Scholarship and Entrepreneurship: A College Board School	X270	Public			
Academy of Mount Saint Ursula		Private, girls	Roman Catholic, Ursuline		
Adlai E. Stevenson Educational Campus; See: Adlai E. Stevenson High School (closed 2009); Bronx Guild; Millennium Art Academy	(split)	Public			
AECI Charter High School	X395	Public charter			
AECI II Charter High School	X611	Public charter			
Alfred E. Smith Career and Technical Education High School; Collocated schools: Bronx Design and Construction Academy; Bronx Haven High School	X600	Public			
All Hallows High School		Private, boys	Roman Catholic		
American Dream Charter School	X471	Public charter			
Antonia Pantoja Preparatory Academy: A College Board School (APPA)	X376	Public			
Archimedes Academy for Math, Science and Technology Applications	X367	Public			
Astor Collegiate Academy (Christopher Columbus campus)	X299	Public			
Belmont Preparatory High School (Theodore Roosevelt campus)	X434	Public			
Bronx Academy of Health Careers (Evander Childs campus)	X290	Public			
Bronx Academy for Software Engineering (BASE)	X264	Public			
Bronx Academy of Letters	X551	Public			
Bronx Aerospace High School (Evander Childs campus)	X545	Public			
Bronx Arena High School	X537	Public, alternative			
Bronx Bridges High School	X432	Public			
Bronx Career & College Preparatory High School	X479	Public			
Bronx Center for Science and Mathematics	X260	Public			
Bronx Collaborative High School	X351	Public			
Bronx Collegiate Academy (formerly Bronx Expeditionary Learning High School) (William H. Taft campus)	X227	Public			
Bronx Community High School	X377	Public, alternative			
Bronx Compass High School	X561	Public			
Bronx Design and Construction Academy (Alfred E. Smith Educational Campus)	X522	Public			
Bronx Early College Academy for Teaching and Learning	X324	Public			
Bronx Engineering and Technology Academy (John F. Kennedy campus)	X213	Public			
Bronx Envision Academy (Collocated at Explorations Academy)	X511	Public, arts			
Bronx Guild (Adlai E. Stevenson Educational Campus)	X452	Public			
Bronx Haven High School (Alfred E.Smith Campus)	X381	Public, alternative			
Bronx Health Sciences High School	X249	Public			
Bronx High School for Law and Community Service; Theodore Roosevelt campus	X439	Public			
Bronx High School for Medical Science] (William H. Taft campus)	X413	Public			
Bronx High School for the Visual Arts	X418	Public			
Bronx High School for Writing and Communication Arts (Evander Childs campus)	X253	Public			
Bronx High School of Business (William H. Taft campus)	X412	Public			
Bronx High School of Science	X445	Public			
Bronx International High School (Morris Campus)	X403	Public			
Bronx Lab School (Evander Childs campus)	X265	Public			
Bronx Latin	X267	Public			
Bronx Leadership Academy High School	X525	Public			
[Bronx Leadership Academy II High School] (Concourse Village campus)	X527	Public			
Bronx Preparatory Charter School	X703	Public charter			
Bronx Regional High School	X480	Public, alternative			
Bronx River High School	X349	Public			
Bronx School for Law, Government and Justice	X505	Public			
Bronx School of Law and Finance (John F. Kennedy campus)	X284	Public			
Bronx Studio School for Writers and Artists	X269	Public			
Bronx Theatre High School (John F. Kennedy campus)	X546	Public			
Bronxdale High School (Christopher Columbus campus)	X508	Public			
The Bronxwood Preparatory Academy	X514	Public			
Cardinal Hayes High School		Private, boys	Roman Catholic		
Cardinal Spellman High School		Private, co-ed	Roman Catholic		
Careers in Sports High School (Concourse Village campus)	X548	Public			
Celia Cruz Bronx High School of Music (Walton Educational Campus)	X442	Public			
Charter High School for Law and Social Justice	X429	Public charter			
The Christopher School		Private, co-ed			
Christopher Columbus High School; Collocated specialty schools: Astor Collegiate Academy; Bronxdale High School; Collegiate Institute for Math and Science	X415	Public			
The Cinema School (James Monroe Campus)	X478	Public			
Claremont International High School	X564	Public			
Collegiate Institute for Math and Science (Christopher Columbus campus)	X288	Public			
Community School for Social Justice	X427	Public			
Comprehensive Model School Project	X327	Public			
Concourse Village campus See: Bronx Leadership Academy II; Urban Assembly School for Careers in Sports	(multiple)	Public			
Crotona International High School	X524	Public			
DeWitt Clinton High School	X440	Public			
Discovery High School (Walton Educational Campus)	X549	Public			
Dr. Richard Izquierdo Health & Science Charter School	X482	Public charter			
DreamYard Preparatory School (William H. Taft campus)	X329	Public			
Eagle Academy for Young Men	X231	Public, boys			
East Bronx Academy for the Future	X271	Public			
English Language Learners and International Support Prep Academy (ELLIS)	X397	Public, alternative			
Evander Childs Educational Campus; See: Bronx Academy of Health Careers; Bronx Aerospace High School; Bronx High School for Writing and Communication Arts; Bronx Lab School; High School for Contemporary Arts; High School of Computers and Technology	(split)	Public			
Eximius College Preparatory Academy: A College Board School	X250	Public			
Explorations Academy; Collocated school: Bronx Envision Academy	X251	Public			
The Equality Charter School	X488	Public			
Fannie Lou Hamer Freedom High School	X682	Public			
The Fieldston School (Ethical Culture Fieldston School)		Private			
Fordham High School for the Arts (Theodore Roosevelt campus)	X437	Public			
Fordham Leadership Academy for Business and Technology (Theodore Roosevelt campus)	X438	Public			
Fordham Preparatory School		Private, boys	Roman Catholic, Jesuit		
Frederick Douglass Academy III Secondary School	X517	Public			
Gotham Collaborative High School	X452	Public			
Harry S Truman High School	X455	Public			
Health Opportunities High School	X670	Public			
Herbert H. Lehman High School; Collocated school: Renaissance High School for Musical Theater & Technology; X293 Renaissance High School for Musical Theater and the Arts; X320 Pelham Lab High School; X558 Westchester Square Academy; X349 Bronx River High School; X348 Schuylerville Preparatory High School	X405	Public			
Health, Education & Research Occupations High School (HERO)	X259	Public			
High School for Contemporary Arts (Evander Childs campus)	X544	Public			
High School for Energy and Technology	X565	Public			
High School for Language and Innovation (Christopher Columbus Educational Campus)	X509	Public			
High School for Teaching and the Professions (Walton Educational Campus)	X433	Public			
High School for Violin and Dance (Morris Campus)	X543	Public			
High School of American Studies at Lehman College	X696	Public			
High School of Computers and Technology (Evander Childs campus)	X275	Public			
High School of World Cultures (James Monroe Campus)	X550	Public			
Horace Mann School		Private, co-ed			
Hostos-Lincoln Academy of Science	X500	Public			
In-Tech Academy	X368	Public			
International Community High School	X334	Public			
International Leadership Charter High School	X347	Public charter			
International School for Liberal Arts (Walton Educational Campus)	X342	Public			
James Monroe Educational Campus; See: James Monroe High School (closed); The Cinema School; High School of World Cultures; The Metropolitan Soundview High School; Pan American International High School at Monroe	(split)	Public			
Jill Chaifetz Transfer High School	X379	Public, alternative			
John F. Kennedy High School; Collocated schools: Bronx Engineering and Technology Academy; Bronx School of Law and Finance; Bronx Theatre High School; Marble Hill High School for International Studies	X475	Public			
Kingsbridge International High School (Walton Educational Campus)	X268	Public			
KIPP NYC College Prep High School	X704	Public			
Knowledge and Power Preparatory Academy International High School (KAPPA) (Theodore Roosevelt campus)	X374	Public			
The Laboratory School of Finance and Technology	X223	Public			
Lavelle School for the Blind		Private, co-ed			
Longwood Preparatory Academy	X530	Public			
Marble Hill High School for International Studies (John F. Kennedy campus)	X477	Public			
The Marie Curie School for Medicine, Nursing, and Health Professions	X237	Public			
The Metropolitan High School	X248	Public			
The Metropolitan Soundview High School (James Monroe Educational Campus)	X521	Public			
Millennium Art Academy (Adlai E. Stevenson Educational Campus)	X312	Public			
Monsignor Scanlan High School		Private, co-ed	Roman Catholic		
Morris Academy for Collaborative Studies (Morris Campus)	X297	Public			
Morris Educational Campus; See: Morris High School (closed); Bronx International High School; High School for Violin and Dance; Morris Academy for Collaborative Studies; School for Excellence	(split)	Public			
Mott Hall Bronx High School	X252	Public			
Mott Haven Community High School	X557	Public, alternative			
Mott Haven Village Preparatory High School (South Bronx campus)	X473	Public			
Mott Hall V Middle/High School	X242	Public			
Mount Saint Michael Academy		Private, boys	Roman Catholic, Marist		
New Directions Secondary School	X350	Public, alternative			
New Life School		Private, co-ed			
New Visions Charter AIM High School II	X200	Public, alternative			
New Visions Charter High School for the Humanities I	X553	Public charter			
New Visions Charter High School for the Humanities II	X208	Public charter			
New Visions Charter High School for Advanced Math & Science I	X539	Public charter			
New Visions Charter High School for Advanced Math & Science II	X202	Public charter			
New World High School	X513	Public			
New York Institute for Special Education		Private, co-ed			
Nuasin Next Generation Charter School	X461	Public			
Pan American International High School at Monroe (James Monroe Campus)	X388	Public; Latino immigrants only			
Pelham Lab High School (Located in: Herbert H. Lehman High School)	X320	Public			
Pelham Preparatory Academy	X542	Public			
Performance Conservatory High School (Bronx High School for Performance and Stagecraft)	X262	Public			
Pharos Academy Charter School	X185	Public charter			
Preston High School		Private, girls	Roman Catholic		
Providing Urban Learners Success in Education (PULSE) High School	X319	Public, alternative			
QSAC School in the Bronx		Private, co-ed			
Renaissance High School for Musical Theater and the Arts (Herbert H. Lehman Educational Campus)	X293	Public			
Riverdale Country School		Private, co-ed			
Riverdale Kingsbridge Academy	X141	Public			
St. Barnabas High School		Private, girls	Roman Catholic		
St. Catharine Academy		Private, girls	Roman Catholic, Sisters of Mercy		
St. Raymond Academy for Girls		Private, girls	Roman Catholic		
St. Raymond High School for Boys		Private, boys	Roman Catholic, Lasallian		
Salanter Akiba of Riverdale (SAR) High School		Private, co-ed	Modern Orthodox Jewish		
School for Excellence (Morris Campus)	X404	Public			
Schuylerville Preparatory High School	X348	Public			
South Bronx Educational Campus; See: South Bronx High School (closed); Mott Haven Village Preparatory High School; University Heights Secondary School	(split)	Public			
South Bronx Community Charter High School	X581	Public			
South Bronx Preparatory: A College Board School	X221	Public			
Theatre Arts Production Company School	X225	Public			
Theodore Roosevelt Educational Campus; See: Theodore Roosevelt High School (closed); Belmont Preparatory High School; Bronx High School for Law and Community Service; Fordham High School for the Arts; Fordham Leadership Academy for Business and Technology; Knowledge and Power Preparatory Academy International High School (KAPPA); West Bronx Academy for the Future	(split)	Public			
University Heights Secondary School (South Bronx campus)	X495	Public			
University Prep Charter High School	X393	Public charter			
Urban Assembly Charter School for Computer Science	X597	Public charter			
The Urban Assembly School for Applied Math and Science	X241	Public			
Urban Dove Team II Charter School	X610	Public, alternative			
Validus Preparatory Academy: An Expeditionary Learning School	X263	Public			
Walton Educational Campus; See: Walton High School (closed); Celia Cruz Bronx High School of Music; Discovery High School; High School for Teaching and the Professions; International School for Liberal Arts; Kingsbridge International High School	(split)	Public			
West Bronx Academy for the Future (Theodore Roosevelt campus)	X243	Public			
Westchester Square Academy	X558	Public			
William Howard Taft Educational Campus; See: William H. Taft High School (closed); Bronx Collegiate Academy; Bronx High School for Medical Science; Bronx High School of Business; DreamYard Preparatory School; The Urban Assembly Academy for History and Citizenship for Young Men	(split)	Public			
Wings Academy	X684	Public			
Women's Academy of Excellence	X282	Public, girls			
World View High School	X353	Public			
Yeshiva of Telshe Alumni		Private	Jewish		
The Young Women's Leadership School of the Bronx	X568	Public, girls			

=== Brooklyn ===
School	P.S. number	Type	Religious affiliation	Website	
School	P.S. number	Type	Religious affiliation	NYC DOE	School
Abraham Lincoln High School	K410	Public			
Academy for College Preparation and Career Exploration:A College Board School (Erasmus Hall Educational Campus)	K382	Public			
Academy for Conservation and the Environment (South Shore Educational Campus)	K637	Public			
Academy for Environmental Leadership (Bushwick Educational Campus)	K403	Public			
Academy for Young Writers	K404	Public			
Academy of Hospitality and Tourism (Erasmus Hall Educational Campus)	K408	Public			
Academy of Innovative Technology (Franklin K. Lane Educational Campus)	K618	Public			
Academy of Urban Planning (Bushwick Educational Campus)	K552	Public			
AHRC Middle / High School		Private, co-ed			
All City Leadership Secondary School	K554	Public			
Al-Madinah School		Private	Islamic		
Al-Noor School		Private	Islamic		
Aspirations Diploma Plus High School	K646	Public			
ATech High School	K610	Public			
Bay Ridge Preparatory School		Private			
Bedford Academy High School	K595	Public			
Benjamin Banneker Academy	K670	Public			
Berkeley Carroll School		Private, co-ed			
Beth Jacob High School		Private, girls	Jewish		
Beth Rivkah		Private, girls	Orthodox Jewish		
Big Apple Academy		Private, co-ed			
Bishop Loughlin Memorial High School		Private, co-ed	Roman Catholic		
B’nos Leah Prospect Park Yeshiva School		Private, girls	Jewish		
B’nos Yisroel High School for Girls		Private, girls	Jewish		
Boerum Hill School for International Studies	K497	Public			
Boys and Girls High School	K455	Public			
Brooklyn Academy High School	K553	Public			
Brooklyn Academy of Global Finance	K688	Public			
Brooklyn Academy of Science and the Environment (BASE) (Prospect Heights Educational Campus)	K547	Public			
Brooklyn Ascend High School	K652	Public			
Brooklyn Bridge Academy (South Shore Educational Campus)	K578	Public, transfer			
Brooklyn College Academy	K555	Public			
Brooklyn Collegiate: A College Board School	K493	Public			
Brooklyn Community High School of Communication, Arts and Media	K412	Public			
Brooklyn Democracy Academy	K643	Public, transfer			
Brooklyn Emerging Leaders Academy Charter School (BELA)	K892	Public charter			
Brooklyn Frontiers High School	K423	Public, transfer			
Brooklyn Generation School (South Shore Educational Campus)	K566	Public			
Brooklyn High School for Law and Technology	K498	Public			
Brooklyn High School for Leadership and Community Service	K616	Public, transfer			
Brooklyn High School of the Arts	K656	Public			
Brooklyn Institute for Liberal Arts	K745	Public			
Brooklyn International High School (Waters Edge Educational Complex)	K439	Public			
Brooklyn Lab School (Franklin K. Lane Educational Campus)	K639	Public			
Brooklyn Laboratory Charter School	K803	Public			
Brooklyn Latin School	K449	Public			
Brooklyn Occupational Training Center	K721	Public, District 75			
Brooklyn Preparatory High School (Harry Van Arsdale Educational Campus)	K488	Public			
Brooklyn Prospect Charter School	K928	Public			
Brooklyn School for Global Studies	K429	Public			
The Brooklyn School for Math and Research (Bushwick Educational Campus)	K168	Public			
Brooklyn School for Music & Theatre (Prospect Heights Educational Campus)	K548	Public			
Brooklyn Secondary School for Collaborative Studies	K448	Public			
Brooklyn Studio Secondary School	K690	Public			
Brooklyn Technical High School	K430	Public			
Brooklyn Theatre Arts High School (South Shore Educational Campus)	K567	Public			
Brooklyn Transition Center	K373	Public, District 75			
Brownsville Academy High School	K568	Public, transfer			
Bushwick Community High School	K564	Public, transfer			
Bushwick Educational Campus; See: Bushwick High School (closed 2006); Academy for Environmental Leadership; Academy of Urban Planning; The Brooklyn School for Math and Research; Bushwick School for Social Justice	(split)	Public			
Bushwick School for Social Justice (Bushwick Educational Campus)	K549	Public			
City Polytechnic High School of Engineering, Architecture, and Technology	K674	Public			
Clara Barton High School	K600	Public			
Cobble Hill School of American Studies	K519	Public			
Coney Island Preparatory Charter School	K744	Public			
Connie Lekas School	K811	Public, District 75			
Coy L. Cox School	K369	Public, District 75			
Cultural Academy for the Arts and Sciences	K629	Public			
Cyberarts Studio Academy	K463	Public			
Cypress Hills Collegiate Preparatory School (Franklin K. Lane Educational Campus)	K659	Public			
Dr. Susan S. McKinney Secondary School of the Arts	K265	Public			
Eagle Academy for Young Men II	K644	Public			
East Brooklyn Community High School	K673	Public, transfer			
East New York Arts and Civics High School	K953	Public			
East New York Family Academy	K409	Public			
EBC High School for Public Service–Bushwick	K545	Public			
EMBER Charter School for Mindful Education, Innovation and Transformation	K406	Public charter			
Edward R. Murrow High School	K525	Public			
El Puente Academy for Peace and Justice	K685	Public			
Enterprise, Business and Technology High School	K478	Public			
Expeditionary Learning School for Community Leaders	K572	Public			
Erasmus Hall Educational Campus; See: Erasmus Hall High School (closed 1994); Academy for College Preparation and Career Exploration:A College Board School; Academy of Hospitality and Tourism; High School for Service & Learning at Erasmus; High School for Youth and Community Development at Erasmus; Science, Technology and Research Early College High School at Erasmus	(split)	Public			
FDNY - Captain Vernon A. Richard High School for Fire and Life Safety (Thomas Jefferson Educational Campus)	K502	Public			
Fontbonne Hall Academy		Private, girls	Roman Catholic		
Fort Hamilton High School	K490	Public			
Franklin Delano Roosevelt High School	K505	Public			
Franklin K. Lane Educational Campus; See: Academy of Innovative Technology; Brooklyn Lab School; Cypress Hills Collegiate Preparatory School; Multicultural High School		Public			
Frederick Douglass Academy VII High School	K514	Public			
George Wingate Educational Campus; See: High School for Public Service: Heroes of Tomorrow; International Arts Business School; The School for Human Rights		Public			
Gerer Mesivta Bais Yisroel School		Private, boys	Jewish		
George Westinghouse Career and Technical Education High School	K605	Public			
Gotham Professional Arts Academy	K594	Public			
The Williamsburg High School of Art and Technology	K454	Public			
Harry Van Arsdale Educational Campus; See: Harry Van Arsdale High School (closed 2007); Brooklyn Preparatory High School; Williamsburg High School for Architecture and Design; Williamsburg Preparatory School	(split)	Public			
The HeartShare School		Private, co-ed			
The High School for Global Citizenship (Prospect Heights Educational Campus)	K528	Public			
High School for Innovation in Advertising and Media	K617	Public			
High School for Medical Professions	K633	Public			
High School for Public Service: Heroes of Tomorrow (George W. Wingate Educational Campus)	K546	Public			
High School for Service & Learning at Erasmus (Erasmus Hall Educational Campus)	K539	Public			
High School for Youth and Community Development at Erasmus (Erasmus Hall Educational Campus)	K537	Public			
High School of Sports Management	K348	Public			
High School of Telecommunication Arts and Technology	K485	Public			
International High School at Lafayette	K337	Public			
International High School at Prospect Heights; Prospect Heights Educational Campus	K524	Public			
It Takes a Village Academy (Samuel J. Tilden Educational Campus)	K563	Public			
James Madison High School	K425	Public			
John Dewey High School	K540	Public			
John Jay Educational Campus; See: John Jay High School (closed 2003); Millennium Brooklyn High School; Park Slope Collegiate (formerly Secondary School for Research); Secondary School for Journalism; Secondary School for Law	(split)	Public			
John Jay School for Law (John Jay Educational Campus)	K462	Public			
Juan Morel Campos School of the Arts	K071	Public			
Khalil Gibran International Academy	K592	Public			
Kings Collegiate Charter School	K608	Public charter			
Kingsborough Early College Secondary School	K468	Public			
Kurt Hahn Expeditionary Learning School (Samuel J. Tilden Educational Campus)	K569	Public			
League School		Private			https://www.league-school.org/]
Leon M. Goldstein High School for the Sciences	K535	Public			
Liberation Diploma Plus	K728	Public, transfer			
LIFE Academy High School for Film and Music	K559	Public			
Lillian L. Rashkis School	K371	Public, District 75			
Lyons Community School	K586	Public			
Magen David Yeshivah High School		Private, co-ed	Jewish		
Math, Engineering and Science Charter Academy	K733	Public charter			
Medgar Evers College Preparatory School	K590	Public			
Merkaz Bnos High School		Private, girls	Jewish		
Mesivta M'kor Chaim School		Private			
Mesivta Nachlas Yakov School		Private	Jewish		
Mesivta of Seagate School		Private, boys	Jewish		
Mesivta Rabbi Chaim Berlin High School		Private	Jewish Orthodox		
Mesivta/Yeshiva Gedola Manhattan Beach School		Private, boys	Jewish		
Metropolitan Diploma Plus High School	K647	Public, transfer			
Midwood High School	K405	Public			
Mikdash Melech Mechina School		Private, boys	Jewish Orthodox		
Millennium Brooklyn High School (John Jay Educational Campus)	K684	Public			
Mirrer Yeshiva High School		Private	Jewish Orthodox		
Multicultural High School (Franklin K. Lane Educational Campus)	K583	Public			
Nazareth Regional High School		Private, co-ed	Roman Catholic		
Nelson Mandela High School	K765	Public			
New Dawn Charter High School	K486	Public charter			
New Visions AIM Charter School I	K395	Public charter			
New Visions Charter High School for Advanced Math & Science III	K738	Public charter			
New Visions Charter High School for the Humanities III	K739	Public charter			
New Utrecht High School	K445	Public			
New York Harbor School	K551	Public			
Northside Collegiate Charter School	K693	Public charter			
Olympus Academy	K635	Public, transfer			
Origins High School	K611	Public			
The Packer Collegiate Institute		Private, co-ed			
Park Slope Collegiate (John Jay Educational Campus)	K464	Public			
Pathways in Technology Early College High School (Collocated at Paul Robeson High School)	K122	Public			
Performing Arts and Technology High School (Thomas Jefferson Educational Campus)	K507	Public			
Poly Prep Country Day School		Private, co-ed			
Professional Pathways High School	K630	Public, transfer			
Progress High School for Professional Careers	K474	Public			
Prospect Heights Educational Campus; See: Prospect Heights High School (closed 2006); Brooklyn Academy of Science and the Environment; Brooklyn School for Music & Theatre; The High School for Global Citizenship; International High School at Prospect Heights	(split)	Public			
P.S. 36	K036	Public, District 75			
P.S. 53	K053	Public, District 75			
P.S. 77	K077	Public, District 75			
P.S. 141	K141	Public, District 75			
P.S. 368	K368	Public, District 75			
P.S. 370	K370	Public, District 75			
P.S. 771	K771	Public, District 75			
Rachel Carson High School for Coastal Studies	K344	Public			
Research and Service High School	K669	Public, transfer			
St. Ann's School		Private, co-ed			
St. Edmund Preparatory High School		Private, co-ed	Roman Catholic		
St. Joseph High School		Private, girls	Roman Catholic		
St. Saviour High School		Private, girls	Roman Catholic		
Samuel J. Tilden Educational Campus; See: Samuel J. Tilden High School (closed ~2010); It Takes a Village Academy; Cultural Academy for the Arts and Sciences; The Kurt Hahn Expeditionary Learning School	(split)	Public			
School for Career Development	K753	Public, District 75			
The School for Classics High School	K683	Public			
The School for Human Rights (George W. Wingate Educational Campus)	K531	Public			
Science Skills Center High School for Science, Technology and the Creative Arts (Waters Edge Educational Complex)	K419	Public			
Science, Technology and Research Early College High School at Erasmus (Erasmus Hall Educational Campus)	K543	Public			
Shulamith High School for Girls		Private, girls	Jewish Orthodox		
Sinai Academy		Private, boys	Jewish		
Soille Bais Yaakov High School		Private, girls	Jewish		
Spring Creek Community School	K422	Public			
South Brooklyn Community High School	K698	Public			
South Shore Educational Campus; See: Academy for Conservation and the Environment; Brooklyn Bridge Academy; Brooklyn Generation School; Brooklyn Theatre Arts High School; Victory Collegiate High School		Public			
Summit Academy Charter School	K730	Public charter			
Sunset Park High School	K667	Public			
Teachers Preparatory High School	K697	Public			
Thomas Jefferson Educational Campus; See: FDNY High School for Fire and Life Safety; Performing Arts and Technology High School; World Academy for Total Community Health High School		Public			
Tiferes Academy		Private, boys	Jewish		
Tiferes Bais Yaakov High School		Private	Jewish		
Tiferes Miriam High School		Private	Jewish		
Tomer Devora High School for Girls		Private, girls	Jewish		
Torah Academy High School		Private, boys	Jewish		
Transit Tech Career and Technical Education High School	K615	Public			
United Lubavitcher Yeshiva		Private, boys	Jewish		
Unity Preparatory Charter School of Brooklyn	K757	Public charter			
Urban Action Academy	K642	Public charter			
Urban Assembly Institute of Math and Science for Young Women	K527	Public, girls			
Urban Assembly School for Collaborative Healthcare	K764	Public			
Urban Assembly School for Leadership and Empowerment	K609	Public			
Urban Assembly School for Law and Justice	K483	Public			
The Urban Assembly School of Music and Art (Waters Edge Educational Complex)	K350	Public			
Urban Dove Charter School	K417	Public charter			
Victory Collegiate High School (South Shore Educational Campus)	K576	Public			
Waters Edge Educational Complex; See: Brooklyn International High School; Science Skills Center High School for Science, Technology and the Creative Arts; Urban Assembly High School of Music and Art	(collocated)	Public			
West Brooklyn Community High School	K529	Public			
William E. Grady Career and Technical Education High School	K620	Public			
William H. Maxwell Career and Technical Education High School	K660	Public			
Williamsburg Charter High School	K473	Public			
Williamsburg High School for Architecture and Design (Harry Van Arsdale Educational Campus)	K558	Public			
Williamsburg Preparatory School (Harry Van Arsdale Educational Campus)	K561	Public			
World Academy for Total Community Health High School (Thomas Jefferson Educational Campus)	K510	Public			
Xaverian High School		Private, boys	Roman Catholic		
Yeshiva Chanoch Lenaar		Private, boys	Jewish		
Yeshiva Derech HaTorah High School		Private, boys	Jewish, Orthodox		
Yeshiva Gedolah of Midwood		Private, boys	Jewish		
Yeshiva Gezdah Bais Yisrael		Private	Jewish		
Yeshiva Karunas Halev		Private, boys	Jewish		
Yeshiva of Flatbush Joel Braverman High School		Private, co-ed	Jewish		
Yeshiva Ohr Moleh Koson		Private, co-ed	Jewish		
Yeshiva Sharro Yosher		Private	Jewish		
Yeshiva Tiferes Shmiel		Private, co-ed	Jewish		
Yeshiva Toraf Hesed		Private, boys	Jewish		
Yeshiva Vyelipol School		Private, boys	Jewish		
Yeshivat Ateret Torah		Private	Jewish		
Yeshivat Or Hatorah		Private, boys	Jewish		
Yeshivat Shaare Torah Boys High School		Private, boys	Jewish Orthodox		
Yeshivat Shaare Torah Girls High School		Private, girls	Jewish Orthodox		
Yeshiva/Mesivta V'yoel Moshe School		Private	Jewish		
The Young Women's Leadership School of Brooklyn	K614	Public, girls			
Zvi Dov Roth Academy of Yeshiva Rambam		Private, co-ed	Jewish		

=== Manhattan ===
School	P.S. number	Type	Religious affiliation	Website	
School	P.S. number	Type	Religious affiliation	NYC DOE	School
A. Philip Randolph Campus High School	M540	Public			
Aaron School		Private			
Abraham Joshua Heschel School		Private, co-ed	Jewish		
Academy of Environmental Science Secondary High School	M635	Public			
Academy for Social Action: A College Board School	M367	Public			
Aichhorn School		Private			
The American Sign Language and English Secondary School	M047	Public, deaf			
Avenues: The World School		Private, for-profit			
Bard High School Early College (see also Bard High School Early College II in Queens)	M696	Public			
Ballet Tech, NYC Public School for Dance	M442	Public			
Baruch College Campus High School	M411	Public			
Bayard Rustin Educational Complex	M440	Public			
The Beacon School (Beacon High School)	M479	Public			
The Beekman School		Private, co-ed			
Bread & Roses Integrated Arts High School	M685	Public			
Brearley School		Private, girls			
The Browning School		Private, boys			
The Calhoun School		Private, co-ed			
Cascades High School (Cascades Center for Teaching & Learning)	M650	Public			
Cathedral High School		Private, girls	Roman Catholic		
Central Park East High School	M555	Public			
Chapin School (Manhattan)		Private, girls			
Chelsea Career and Technical Education High School)	M615	Public			
The Child School Legacy High School, Roosevelt Island		Private, co-ed			
Choir Academy of Harlem	M469	Public			
Churchill School		Private, co-ed			
City-As-School (High School M560 - City As School)	M560	Public			
Coalition School for Social Change	M409	Public			
Collegiate School		Private, boys			
Columbia Grammar & Preparatory School		Private, co-ed			
Columbia Secondary School (Columbia Secondary School for Math, Science & Engineering)	M362	Public			
Cooke School		Private			
Cristo Rey New York High School		Private, co-ed	Roman Catholic, Jesuit		
Convent of the Sacred Heart		Private, girls	Roman Catholic		
The Dalton School		Private, co-ed			
Daytop Preparatory School		Private			
Dominican Academy		Private, girls	Roman Catholic, Dominican		
The Dwight School		Private, co-ed			
East Side Community High School	M450	Public			
Edward A. Reynolds West Side High School	M505	Public			
Eleanor Roosevelt High School	M416	Public			
Elisabeth Irwin High School (Little Red Schoolhouse & Elisabeth Irwin High School) (LREI)		Private, co-ed			
Essex Street Academy (Seward Park campus)	M294	Public			
The Facing History School (Park West campus)	M303	Public			
Fiorello H. LaGuardia High School of Music & Art and Performing Arts	M485	Public			
Food and Finance High School (Park West campus)	M288	Public			
Frederick Douglass Academy; See also: Frederick Douglass Academy II Secondary School (Manhattan); Frederick Douglass Academy III Secondary School (Bronx); Frederick Douglass Academy IV Secondary School (Brooklyn); Frederick Douglass Academy VI High School (Queens); Frederick Douglass Academy VII High School (Brooklyn)	M499	Public			
Frederick Douglass Academy II Secondary School	M860	Public			
Friends Seminary		Private, co-ed	Quaker		
Fusion Academy & Learning Center		Private, co-ed			
George Washington High School; See: High School for Health Careers and Sciences; High School for International Business and Finance; High School for Law and Public Service; High School for Media and Communications	(split)	Public			
Gramercy Arts High School	M374	Public			
Greenwich Village High School		Private			
Gregorio Luperon High School for Math & Science (Gregorio Luperon High School for Science and Mathematics)	M552	Public			
Harlem Renaissance High School	M285	Public			
Harvey Milk High School	M586	Public			
Henry Street School for International Studies	M292	Public			
The Heritage School	M680	Public			
The Hewitt School		Private, girls			
High School for Arts, Imagination and Inquiry (Martin Luther King, Jr. campus)	M299	Public			
High School for Climate Justice	M655	Public			
High School for Dual Language and Asian Studies (Seward Park campus)	M545	Public			
High School For Environmental Studies	M400	Public			
High School for Health Careers and Sciences (George Washington campus)	M468	Public			
High School for Health Professions and Human Services	M420	Public			
High School for Humanities Educational Campus; See: Bayard Rustin High School for the Humanities; Humanities Preparatory Academy; The James Baldwin School					
High School for International Business and Finance (George Washington campus)	M462	Public			
High School for Law, Advocacy, and Community Justice (Martin Luther King, Jr. campus)	M492	Public			
High School for Law and Public Service (George Washington campus)	M467	Public			
IDEAL School		Private			
High School for Leadership and Public Service	M425	Public			
High School for Math, Science and Engineering at City College	M692	Public			
High School for Media and Communications (George Washington campus)	M463	Public			
High School of Art and Design	M630	Public			
High School of Arts and Technology (Martin Luther King, Jr. campus)	M494	Public			
High School of Economics and Finance	M489	Public			
High School of Fashion Industries	M600	Public			
High School of Graphic Communication Arts; Collocated school: Urban Assembly Gateway School for Technology	M625	Public			
High School of Hospitality Management (Park West campus)	M296	Public			
Humanities Preparatory Academy (High School for Humanities Educational Campus)	M605	Public			
Hunter College High School		Public (CUNY)			
Independence High School	M544	Public			
Institute for Collaborative Education	M407	Public			
Jacqueline Kennedy Onassis High School	M529	Public			
The James Baldwin School: A School for Expeditionary Learning (High School for Humanities Educational Campus)	M313	Public			
John V. Lindsay Wildcat Academy Charter School	M707	Public			
Julia Richman Education Complex; See: Julia Richman High School (closed 1995); Manhattan International High School; Talent Unlimited High School; Vanguard High School	(split)	Public			
La Salle Academy		Private, boys	Roman Catholic, Lasallian		
Landmark High School	M419	Public			
Legacy School for Integrated Studies	M429	Public			
Léman Manhattan Preparatory School		Private, co-ed			
Liberty High School Academy for Newcomers	M550	Public			
Life Sciences Secondary School	M655	Public			
The Lorge School		Private, co-ed			
Louis D. Brandeis High School	M470	Public			
Lower East Side Preparatory High School	M515	Public			
Lower Manhattan Arts Academy (Seward Park campus)	M308	Public			
Loyola School		Private, co-ed	Roman Catholic, Jesuit		
Lycée français de New York (LFNY)		Private, co-ed			
Manhattan Bridges High School (Park West campus)	M542	Public			
Manhattan Center for Science and Mathematics	M435	Public			
Manhattan Childrens Center		Private			
Manhattan Comprehensive Night and Day High School	M575	Public			
Manhattan High School for Girls		Private, girls	Jewish		
Manhattan/Hunter College High School for Sciences (Manhattan/Hunter Science High School) (Hunter College High School for the Sciences) (Martin Luther King, Jr. campus)	M541	Public			
Manhattan International High School (Julia Richman Education Complex - MIHS)	M459	Public			
Manhattan Theatre Lab High School (Martin Luther King, Jr. campus) (closed 2015)	M283	Public			
Manhattan Village Academy	M439	Public			
Marta Valle High School (Marta Valle Secondary School)	M509	Public			
Martin Luther King High School; See: High School for Arts, Imagination and Inquiry; High School for Law, Advocacy and Community Justice; High School of Arts and Technology; Hunter College High School (Manhattan/Hunter Science High School); Manhattan Theatre Lab High School; The Urban Assembly School for Media Studies	(split)	Public			
Marymount School		Private, girls	Roman Catholic		
Millennium High School	M418	Public			
Mother Cabrini High School (closed 2014)		Private, girls	Roman Catholic		
Mott Hall High School	M304	Public			
Murry Bergtraum High School for Business Careers	M520	Public			
New Design High School (Seward Park campus)	M543	Public			
New Explorations into Science, Technology and Math High School (NEST+m High School)	M539	Public			
NYC iSchool	M376	Public			
New York City Lab School for Collaborative Studies	M412	Public			
New York City Museum School	M414	Public			
Nightingale-Bamford School		Private, girls			
Norman Thomas High School (closed 2014)	M620	Public			
Northeastern Academy		Private, co-ed	Seventh-day Adventist		
Notre Dame School		Private, girls	Roman Catholic		
Pace High School	M298	Public			
Park East High School	M495	Public			
Park West High School; See: The Facing History School; Food and Finance High School; High School of Hospitality Management; Manhattan Bridges High School; The Urban Assembly School of Design and Construction	(split)	Public			
Professional Children's School		Private, co-ed			
Professional Performing Arts School	M408	Public			
Quest to Learn		Public, co-ed			
Ramaz School		Private, co-ed	Modern Orthodox Jewish		
Rebecca School		Private			
Regis High School		Private, boys	Roman Catholic, Jesuit		
Repertory Company High School for Theatre Arts	M531	Public			
Rice High School (closed 2011)		Private, boys	Roman Catholic		
Richard R. Green High School of Teaching	M580	Public			
The Robert Louis Stevenson School		Private, co-ed			
St. Agnes Boys High School (closed 2013)		Private, boys	Roman Catholic, Marist		
St. Jean Baptiste High School		Private, girls	Roman Catholic		
St. Michael Academy (closed 2010)		Private, girls	Roman Catholic		
St. Vincent Ferrer High School		Private, girls	Roman Catholic		
Sacred Heart (See Convent of the Sacred Heart)					
Satellite Academy High School	M570	Public, transfer			
School for the Physical City High School (closed 2010)	M690	Public			
School of the Future	M413	Public			
Seward Park High School; See: Essex Street Academy; High School for Dual Language and Asian Studies; Lower Manhattan Arts Academy; New Design High School; The Urban Assembly Academy of Government and Law	(split)	Public			
The Smith School		Private, co-ed			
Solomon Schechter High School of New York		(closed)	Jewish		
Spence School		Private, girls			
Stuyvesant High School	M475	Public			
Talent Unlimited High School (Julia Richman Education Complex - TUHS)	M519	Public			
Thurgood Marshall Academy for Learning and Social Change	M670	Public			
Trevor Day School		Private, co-ed			
Trinity School		Private, co-ed			
United Nations International School		Private, co-ed			
Unity Center for Urban Technologies	M500	Public			
University Neighborhood High School	M448	Public			
Urban Academy Laboratory High School (Julia Richman Education Complex - UALHS)	M565	Public			
The Urban Assembly Academy of Government and Law (Seward Park campus)	M305	Public			
Urban Assembly Gateway School for Technology; Collocated at High School of Graphic Communication Arts	M507	Public			
The Urban Assembly New York Harbor School (Governors Island)	M551	Public			
The Urban Assembly School for Media Studies (Martin Luther King, Jr. campus)	M307	Public			
Urban Assembly School for the Performing Arts	M369	Public			
The Urban Assembly School of Business for Young Women	M316	Public, girls			
The Urban Assembly School of Design and Construction (Park West campus)	M300	Public			
Urban Peace Academy (closed 2010)	M695	Public			
Vanguard High School (Julia Richman Education Complex - VHS)	M449	Public			
Wadleigh Secondary School for the Performing & Visual Arts	M415	Public			
Washington Irving High School (closed 2015)	M460	Public			
Winston Preparatory School		Private, co-ed			
Xavier High School		Private, boys	Roman Catholic, Jesuit		
Yeshiva University High School for Boys		Private, boys	Jewish		
York Preparatory School		Private, co-ed			
Young Women's Leadership School	M610	Public, girls			
Washington Heights Expeditionary Learning School	M348	Public			

=== Queens ===
School	P.S. number	Type	Religious affiliation	Website	
School	P.S. number	Type	Religious affiliation	NYC DOE	School
Academy for Careers in Television and Film	Q301	Public			
Academy of American Studies	Q575	Public			
Academy of Finance and Enterprise	Q264	Public			
Academy of Medical Technology (Far Rockaway Educational Campus)	Q309	Public			
Al-Iman School		Private, co-ed	Islamic		
Archbishop Molloy High School		Private, co-ed	Roman Catholic		
August Martin High School	Q400	Public			
Aviation High School	Q610	Public			
Baccalaureate School for Global Education	Q580	Public			
Bais Yaakov Machon Academy (closed 2009)		Private, girls	Jewish		
Bard High School Early College II (see also Bard High School Early College in Manhattan)	Q299	Public			
Bayside High School	Q495	Public			
Beach Channel High School (closing 2014); Collocated schools: Channel View School for Research – Q262; Rockaway Collegiate High School – Q351; Rockaway Park High School for Environmental Sustainability – Q324	Q410	Public			
Cambria Heights Academy for New Literacies	Q326	Public			
Campus Magnet Educational Campus; Collocated schools: Andrew Jackson High School (Queens) (closed 1994); Humanities and the Arts Magnet High School – Q498; Mathematics, Science Research and Technology Magnet High School – Q492; Institute for Health Professions at Cambria Heights – Q243; Benjamin Franklin High School for Finance & Information Technology - Q313; Business, Computer Applications & Entrepreneurship High School (closed 2016); Law, Government and Community Service High School (closed 2016)	Q490	Public			
Benjamin N. Cardozo High School	Q415	Public			
Cathedral Preparatory Seminary		Private, boys	Roman Catholic		
Channel View School for Research (Beach Channel Educational Campus)	Q262	Public			
Christ The King Regional High School		Private, co-ed	Roman Catholic		
East-West School of International Studies	Q281	Public			
Evangel Christian School		Private, co-ed	Christian, nonsectarian		
Excelsior Preparatory High School (Springfield Gardens Educational Campus)	Q265	Public			
Ezra Academy		Private, co-ed	Jewish		
Far Rockaway Educational Campus; See: Far Rockaway High School – Q465 (closed 2011); Academy of Medical Technology: A College Board School – Q309; Frederick Douglass Academy VI High School – Q260; Queens High School for Information, Research, and Technology – Q302	(split)	Public			
Flushing High School	Q460	Public			
Flushing International High School	Q263	Public			
Forest Hills High School	Q440	Public			
Francis Lewis High School	Q430	Public			
Frank Sinatra School of the Arts High School	Q501	Public			
Frederick Douglass Academy VI High School (Far Rockaway Educational Campus)	Q260	Public			
Garden School		Private, co-ed			
Gateway to Health Science High School		Public, alternative			
George Washington Carver High School for the Sciences (Springfield Gardens Educational Campus)	Q272	Public			
Greater New York Academy of Seventh-day Adventists		Private, co-ed	Seventh-day Adventist		
Grover Cleveland High School	Q485	Public			
High School for Arts and Business	Q550	Public			
High School for Community Leadership (Jamaica High School campus)	Q328	Public			
High School for Construction Trades, Engineering and Architecture	Q650	Public			
High School for Law Enforcement and Public Safety	Q690	Public			
High School of Applied Communication	Q267	Public			
Hillcrest High School	Q505	Public			
Hillside Arts & Letters Academy (Jamaica High School campus)	Q325	Public			
Holy Cross High School		Private, co-ed	Roman Catholic		
Humanities & Arts Magnet High School	Q498	Public			
Information Technology High School	Q502	Public			
International High School at LaGuardia Community College	Q530	Public			
Jamaica Gateway to the Sciences (Jamaica High School campus)	Q350	Public			
Jamaica High School; Collocated schools: High School for Community Leadership – Q328; Hillside Arts & Letters Academy – Q325; Jamaica Gateway to the Sciences – Q350; Queens Collegiate: A College Board School – Q310	Q470	Public			
John Adams High School	Q480	Public			
John Bowne High School	Q425	Public			
John F. Kennedy Jr. School (formerly Queens Occupational Training Center)	Q721	Public			
Lexington School and Center for the Deaf		Private, co-ed			
Long Island City High School	Q450	Public			
The Lowell School		Private, co-ed			
Martin Luther High School		Private, co-ed	Christian, Lutheran		
Martin Van Buren High School	Q435	Public			
The Mary Louis Academy		Private, girls	Roman Catholic		
Maspeth High School	Q585	Public			
Mathematics, Science Research and Technology Magnet High School	Q492	Public			
Mesivta Ohr Torah School		Private, boys	Jewish		
Mesivta Yesodei Yeshurun		Private, boys	Jewish		
Metropolitan Expeditionary Learning School (Queens Metropolitan High School campus)	Q167	Public			
Middle College High School at LaGuardia Community College	Q520	Public			
Monsignor McClancy Memorial High School		Private, co-ed	Roman Catholic		
Newcomers High School	Q555	Public			
Newtown High School	Q455	Public			
New York Child Learning Institute		Private, co-ed			
North Queens Community High School	Q792	Public			
Pan American International High School	Q296	Public			
Pathways College Preparatory School: A College Board School	Q259	Public			
Phyllis L. Susser School For Exceptional Children		Private, co-ed			
Preparatory Academy for Writers: A College Board School (Springfield Gardens Educational Campus)	Q283	Public			
Project Blend School, Jamaica		Private			
QSAC School at Whitestone		Private, co-ed			
Queens Academy High School	Q540	Public			
Queens Collegiate: A College Board School (Jamaica High School campus)	Q310	Public			
Queens Gateway to Health Sciences Secondary School	Q680	Public			
Queens High School for Information, Research, and Technology (Far Rockaway Educational Campus)	Q302	Public			
Queens High School for the Sciences	Q687	Public			
Queens High School of Teaching, Liberal Arts and the Sciences	Q566	Public			
Queens Metropolitan High School; Collocated schools: Metropolitan Expeditionary Learning High School – Q167	Q686	Public			
Queens Preparatory Academy (Springfield Gardens Educational Campus)	Q248	Public			
Queens Vocational and Technical High School	Q600	Public			
Razi School		Private, co-ed	Islamic		
Renaissance Charter School (Queens)	Q705	Public			
Richmond Hill High School	Q475	Public			
Robert F. Kennedy Community High School	Q670	Public			
Robert F. Wagner, Jr. Secondary School for Arts and Technology (Robert F. Wagner, Jr. Institute for Arts & Technology)	Q560	Public			
Robert H. Goddard High School of Communication Arts and Technology	Q308	Public			
Rockaway Collegiate High School (Beach Channel Educational Campus)	Q351	Public			
Rockaway Park High School for Environmental Sustainability (Beach Channel Educational Campus)	Q324	Public			
St. Agnes High School (Closed in 2021)		Private, girls	Roman Catholic		
St. Demetrios School		Private, co-ed	Greek Orthodox		
The Shield Institute		Private, co-ed			
St. Francis Preparatory School		Private, co-ed	Roman Catholic		
St. George Academy		Private	Ukrainian Catholic		
St. John's Preparatory School		Private, co-ed	Roman Catholic		
Scholars' Academy	Q323	Public			
Shevach High School		Private, girls	Jewish		
Springfield Gardens Educational Campus, includes: Excelsior Preparatory High School; George Washington Carver High School for the Sciences; Preparatory Academy for Writers: A College Board School; Queens Preparatory Academy					
Stella Maris High School (closing June 2010)		Private, girls	Roman Catholic		
Summit School		Private, co-ed			[]
Thomas A. Edison Vocational and Technical High School	Q620	Public			
Tiegerman High School		Private, co-ed			
Torah Academy High School for Girls		Private, girls	Jewish		
Townsend Harris High School	Q525	Public			
VOYAGES Preparatory	Q744	Public			
Whitestone Academy		Private, co-ed			
William Cullen Bryant High School	Q445	Public			
Windsor School		Private, co-ed			
World Journalism Preparatory: A College Board School	Q285	Public			
Yeshiva Berachel David-Torah School		Private, boys	Jewish		
Yeshiva Binat Chaim - Boys School		Private, boys	Jewish		
Yeshiva of Far Rockaway (Yeshiva Derech Ayson)		Private, boys	Jewish Orthodox		
Yeshiva Shaar Hatoreh Research		Private, boys	Jewish		
Yeshiva University High School for Girls (Samuel H. Wang Yeshiva University High School for Girls)		Private, girls	Jewish		
Young Women's Leadership School, Astoria	Q286	Public, girls			
Young Women's Leadership School, Queens	Q896	Public, girls			

=== Staten Island ===
School	P.S. number	Type	Religious affiliation	Website	
School	P.S. number	Type	Religious affiliation	NYC DOE	School
College of Staten Island High School for International Studies (CSI High School for International Studies)	R047	Public			
Concord High School	R470	Public			
Curtis High School	R450	Public			
The David Marquis School of the Arts	R037	Public			
Eden II School for Autistic Children		Private, co-ed			
Gaynor McCown Expeditionary Learning School	R064	Public			
James P. Murphy Staten Island Preparatory School		Private, co-ed			
Mesivta Kesser Yisroel		Private	Jewish		
Michael J. Petrides School	R080	Public			
Miraj Islamic School		Private	Islamic		
Monsignor Farrell High School		Private, boys	Roman Catholic		
Moore Catholic High School		Private, co-ed	Roman Catholic		
New Dorp High School	R440	Public			
Notre Dame Academy High School		Private, girls	Roman Catholic		
Port Richmond High School	R445	Public			
Ralph R. McKee Career and Technical Education High School	R600	Public			
Richard H. Hungerford School		Public			
South Richmond High School	R025	Public			
St. Joseph by the Sea High School		Private, co-ed	Roman Catholic		
St. Joseph Hill Academy		Private, girls	Roman Catholic		
St. Peter's Boys High School		Private, boys	Roman Catholic, Lasallian		
Staten Island Academy		Private, co-ed			
Staten Island Technical High School	R605	Public			
Susan E. Wagner High School	R460	Public			
Tottenville High School	R455	Public			
Yeshiva of Staten Island		Private, boys	Jewish		
Yeshiva Tifereth Torah		Private	Jewish		

== See also ==
- List of high schools in New York State
- List of school districts in New York
