= Sequel Youth and Family Services =

For-profit operator of behavioral healthcare facilities

- Founded: April 19, 1992; 34 years ago Clarinda, Iowa, United States
- Headquarters: Huntsville, Alabama
- Key people: John "Jay" Ripley
- Revenue: $154,000,000
- Number of employees: about 2,500

Sequel Youth and Family Services is a private for-profit operator of behavioral healthcare facilities for children and youth in the United States. The company is headquartered in Huntsville, Alabama and owns a nationwide network of over 40 facilities in more than 15 states, including residential treatment centers, group homes, special schools, and community-based programs.

== History ==
Sequel Youth and Family Services were formed out of Youth Services International (YSI), a for-profit juvenile corrections company. Adam Shapiro and John "Jay" Ripley, who both worked for YSI, co-founded Sequel Youth and Family Services in 1999 and currently serve as co-chairmen on the company's board.

Sequel was initially founded to operate Clarinda Academy, a youth residential facility in Clarinda, Iowa. Sequel has expanded over the years by acquiring various youth facilities across the country, including some former YSI facilities.

In September 2009, Sequel Youth and Family Services acquired Three Springs Inc. (TSI), an operator of youth behavioral health facilities based in Huntsville, Alabama.

In September 2017, the private equity firm Altamont Capital acquired a majority stake in Sequel Youth and Family Services.

In September 2021, Ripley formed Vivant Behavioral Healthcare to "buy a majority of the business of Sequel Youth & Family Services."

== Criticism and controversies ==
=== Abuse ===
There have been a number of cases of abuse at Sequel facilities.

In mid 2019, the firm closed Mount Pleasant Academy and Red Rock Canyon School both in St. George, Utah after press reports of sexual abuse and a riot at the Red Rock Canyon facility. Ten members of staff at the Red Rock Canyon School had been charged with child abuse.

In 2019, the state of Oregon brought home all foster children it sent to out-of-state Sequel facilities.

In April 2020, 16-year-old Cornelius Frederick was killed by staff at the now-closed Lakeside Academy in Kalamazoo. As a result of the death, the company lost its license to operate in the state and facility was closed.

In February 2021, the company announced it would close the Clarinda Academy in Iowa. The school, which operated under a contract with the Iowa Department of Human Services, faced charges of rape of children, beatings, and indefinite use of solitary confinement.

In March 2021, a staff member at the Falcon Ridge Academy in Virgin, Utah was arrested on charges of sexual battery for showing pornography to minors and spanking 4 patients.

In July 2021, the state of California brought home all foster children it sent to out-of-state Sequel facilities.

=== Closed facilities ===
As of 2021, the following Sequel-owned facilities have closed:

- Auldern Academy, Siler City, North Carolina (2009 - 2021)
- Bernalillo Academy, Albuquerque, New Mexico (2012 - 2021)
- Clarinda Academy, Clarinda, Iowa (1999 - 2021)
- Kingston Academy, Kingston, Tennessee (2009 - 2019)
- Lakeside Academy, Kalamazoo, Michigan (2007 - 2020)
- Lexington Academy, Lexington, Indiana (1996 - 2017)
- Mount Pleasant Academy, Mount Pleasant, Utah (2016 - 2019)
- Normative Services Academy, Sheridan, Wyoming (2003 - 2021)
- Northern Illinois Academy, Aurora, Illinois (2021)
- Red Rock Canyon School, St. George, Utah (2016 - 2019)
- Riverside Academy, Wichita, Kansas (2011 - 2019)
- Rose Rock Academy, Oklahoma City, Oklahoma (2011 - 2016)
- Sequel Pomegranate Health Systems, Columbus, Ohio (2016 - 2021)
- Sequel TSI Madison, Madison, Alabama (2009 - 2019)
- Sequel TSI North Carolina, Pittsboro, North Carolina (2009 - 2010)
- Sequel TSI of Kissimmee, Kissimmee, Florida (2009 - 2016)
- Sequel TSI Paint Rock Valley, Trenton, Alabama (2009 - 2011)
- Sequel TSI Sierra Vista, Hereford, Arizona (2009 - 2011)
- Starr Albion Prep, Albion, Michigan (2014 - 2020)
- Union Juvenile Residential Facility, Raiford, Florida (2009 - 2019)
- Sequel TSI of Owens Cross Roads, Owens Cross Roads, Alabama

== Facilities ==
In 2021, Sequel ran the following facilities:

- Sequel TSI of Courtland, Courtland, Alabama
- Sequel TSI of Montgomery, Montgomery, Alabama
- Sequel TSI of Tuskegee, Tuskegee, Alabama
- Casa Grande Academy, Casa Grande, Arizona
- Mingus Mountain Academy, Prescott Valley, Arizona
- SequelCare of Arizona, Prescott, Arizona
- Alachua Academy, Gainesville, Florida
- Charles Britt Academy, St. Petersburg, Florida
- Columbus Youth Academy, Tampa, Florida
- Duval Academy, Jacksonville, Florida
- Marion Youth Academy, Ocala, Florida
- Palm Beach Youth Academy, West Palm Beach, Florida
- Pompano Youth Treatment Center, Pompano Beach, Florida
- St. John's Youth Academy, St. Augustine, Florida
- SequelCare of Florida, Pinellas Park, Port Richey, Port St. Lucie, West Palm Beach, and Vero Beach, Florida
- Mountain Home Academy, Mountain Home, Idaho
- Forest Ridge Youth Services, Gruver, Iowa
- Woodward Academy, Woodward, Iowa
- Woodward Community Based Services, Urbandale, Iowa
- North Shore Pediatric Therapy, Chicago, Deerfield, Des Plaines, Evanston, Glenview, Lake Bluff, Lincolnwood, and Naperville, Illinois
- Lakeside Academy, Goddard, Kansas
- SequelCare of Maine, Bangor, Rockland, Searsport, and Yarmouth, Maine
- Sequel Alliance Family Services, Reno, Nevada
- Capital Academy, Camden, New Jersey
- Bernalillo Academy, Albuquerque, New Mexico
- Aaron School, New York, New York
- Rebecca School, New York, New York
- SequelCare of Oklahoma, Antlers, Broken Bow, Durant, Hugo, Poteau, and Tulsa, Oklahoma
- Sequel Transition Academy, Sioux Falls, South Dakota
- Norris Academy, Andersonville, Tennessee
- Pine Cone Therapies, Keller, Missouri City, and Southlake, Texas
- Falcon Ridge Ranch, Virgin, Utah
- Lava Heights Academy, Tocqueville, Utah

== See also ==
- Youth services
