= Brooklyn Academy =

Brooklyn Academy may refer to any of these institutions in Brooklyn, New York:

- Brooklyn Academy of Fine Arts
- Brooklyn Academy of Music
- Brooklyn Academy of Science and the Environment
- Brooklyn College Academy
- Brooklyn Democracy Academy
