= International High School =

International High School may refer to:

== Australia ==
- Banksia Park International High School, Adelaide, South Australia

== United States ==
- International High School (New Jersey), Paterson, New Jersey
- International High School (Queens), New York City
- International High School at Prospect Heights, New York City
- Washington Irving Campus, New York City
- International High School of New Orleans, New Orleans
- International High School of San Francisco, San Francisco
- Houston Academy for International Studies, Houston
- Sharpstown International School, Texas
