= Williamsburg High School =

Williamsburg High School may refer to the following secondary schools in the United States:

- Williamsburg High School for Architecture and Design in New York City
- Williamsburg Charter High School in New York City
- Williamsburg High School in Williamsburg, Iowa
- Williamsburg High School in Williamsburg, Kansas
- Williamsburg High School in Williamsburg, Kentucky
- Williamsburg High School in Williamsburg, Ohio

== See also ==
- Williamsburg-James City County Public Schools
