= Mingus Mountain Academy =

Private school in Prescott Valley, Arizona

Coordinates: 34°38′36″N 112°11′16″W

Location
- 15801 E Don Carlos Dr, Prescott Valley, Arizona 86315; United States

Information
- School type: BHIF/RTC
- Established: January 1985 (41 years ago)
- CEEB code: 030050
- NCES School ID: A1900121
- Teaching staff: 12.0 (on an FTE basis)
- Grades: 6–12
- Enrollment: 137 (2019–2020)
- Student to teacher ratio: 11.4
- Colors: Maroon and gold
- Mascot: Mountain Lions
- Accreditation: North Central Association; JCAHO
- Website: www.mmaaz.com

Mingus Mountain Academy is a private, all-girls alternative high school in Prescott Valley, Arizona, United States. It is operated by Sequel Youth and Family Services. It is one of three Arizona Interscholastic Association-member single-sex high schools, along with Brophy College Preparatory/Xavier College Preparatory. Mingus Mountain Academy is also a behavioral treatment center for troubled youth. Many girls who attend the academy have come from Juvenile Hall, the streets, or past placements. This treatment facility offers girls skills to use after they leave Mingus.
