= High School for Writing and Communication Arts =

Public school in New York City

Coordinates: 40°52′31″N 73°51′42″W

Bronx High School for Writing and Communication Arts

Location
- 800 East Gun Hill Road; The Bronx; New York, New York 10467; United States

Information
- School type: Public high school
- Established: 2004
- School board: NYC DoE
- School number: X253
- Principal: Terri Grey
- Grades: 9–12
- Gender: M/F
- Enrollment: 417 (2011-03)

Bronx High School for Writing and Communication Arts is a public high school located in the New York City borough of The Bronx. The school is collocated with five other high schools on the Evander Childs Educational Campus.

== History ==
The school opened with a 9th-grade class in fall 2004 under Principal Steven Chernigoff. A grade level was added each year until 9th through 12th grades were offered in 2007.

== Student population ==
According to the NYC Department of Education, as of March 2011, the school had a total enrollment of 417 students, of which 60% were girls and 40% were boys. 6.47% of the students were English-language learners.

== Course offerings ==
Partly due to the small size of the school, it only offers a minimal number of classes.

- Mathematics: Algebra, Math A, Math B
- Science: Living Environment, Earth Science, Chemistry
- History: U.S History, Global History, Economics
- Foreign Language: Spanish (The choice is not optional)
- English: English 1–8, Journalism, English workshops
- Physical Education and Health
- Art
- Technology

== Partnership ==
The school maintains a partnership with Epic Theater Center, a New York City-based theatrical company that also produces education programs.

== See also ==
- List of high schools in New York City
