= Thurgood Marshall Academy for Learning and Social Change =

Public school in New York City

Thurgood High
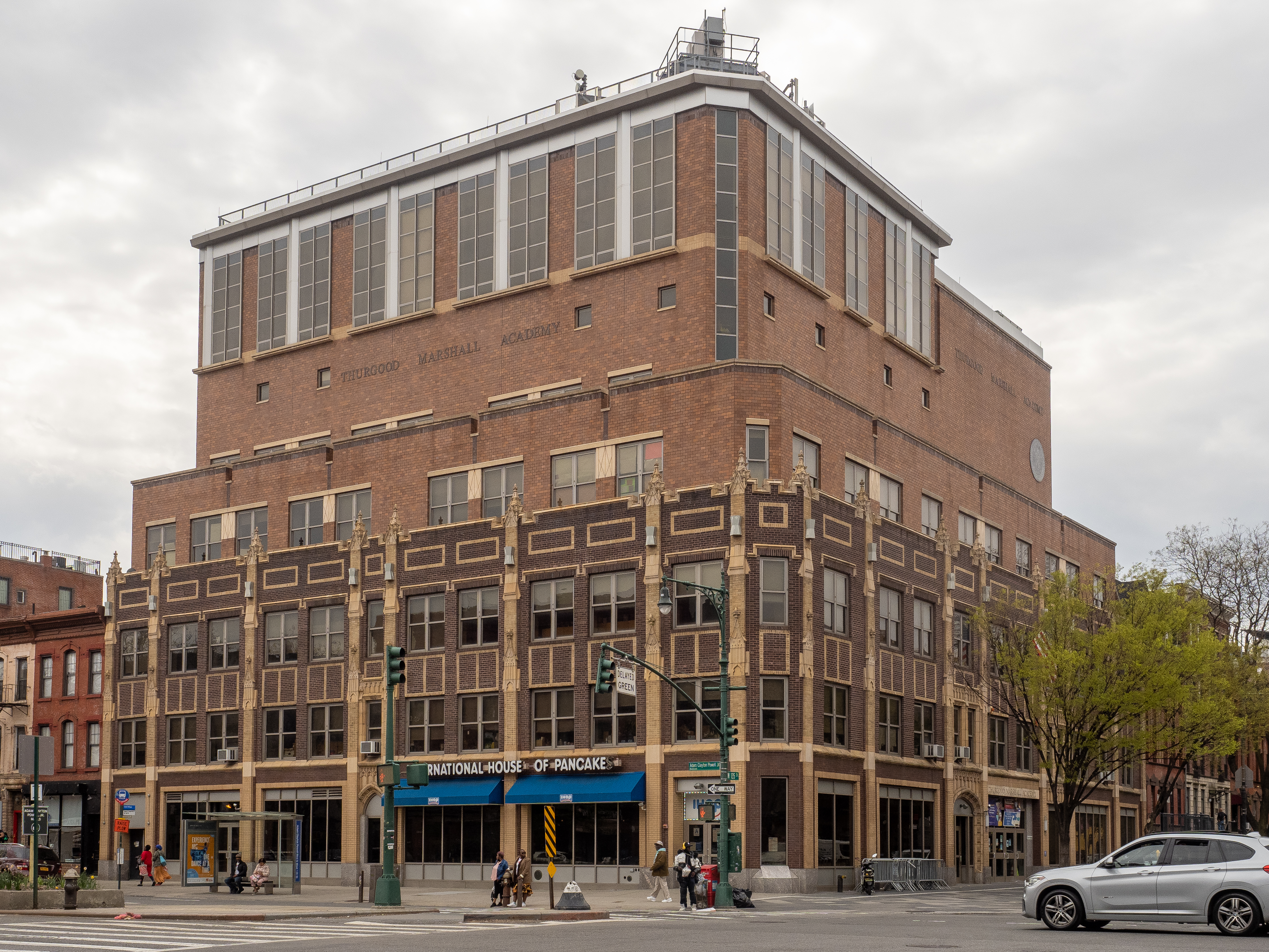
- View of the school in 2022

Location
- 200-214 West 135th Street; New York, NY 10030; United States; 40.8153°N 73.9443°W

Information
- Established: 1993
- Grades: 6 - 12
- Website: www.tmanyc.org

Thurgood Marshall Academy for Learning and Social Change is a public middle and high school in New York City serving grades 6 to 12. It is named for United States Supreme Court Justice Thurgood Marshall.

The school opened in 1993 with Harriet Pitts as principal. It is at 200-214 W 135th Street in Harlem.

The school's student body is 70 percent African American and 26 percent Hispanic. About 70 percent are from economically disadvantaged families.

After moving four times in its first 11 years, it moved into a new $38 million 6-story 90,000 square foot school building in 2004. Thurgood Marshall's wife Cecilia Marshall was among the dignitaries to attend opening ceremonies for the new school building.

Calvin Butts III and the Abyssinian Development Corporation (ADC) were involved in founding the school.

Retailer Burlington helped fund a 2017 renovation of the school's library. In 2017, a teacher at the school was charged with assault after allegedly grabbing a 17-year-old female student by the neck.

== See also ==
- Bushwick School for Social Justice
- Smalls Paradise
