= Robert F. Kennedy Community High School =

Public school in New York City

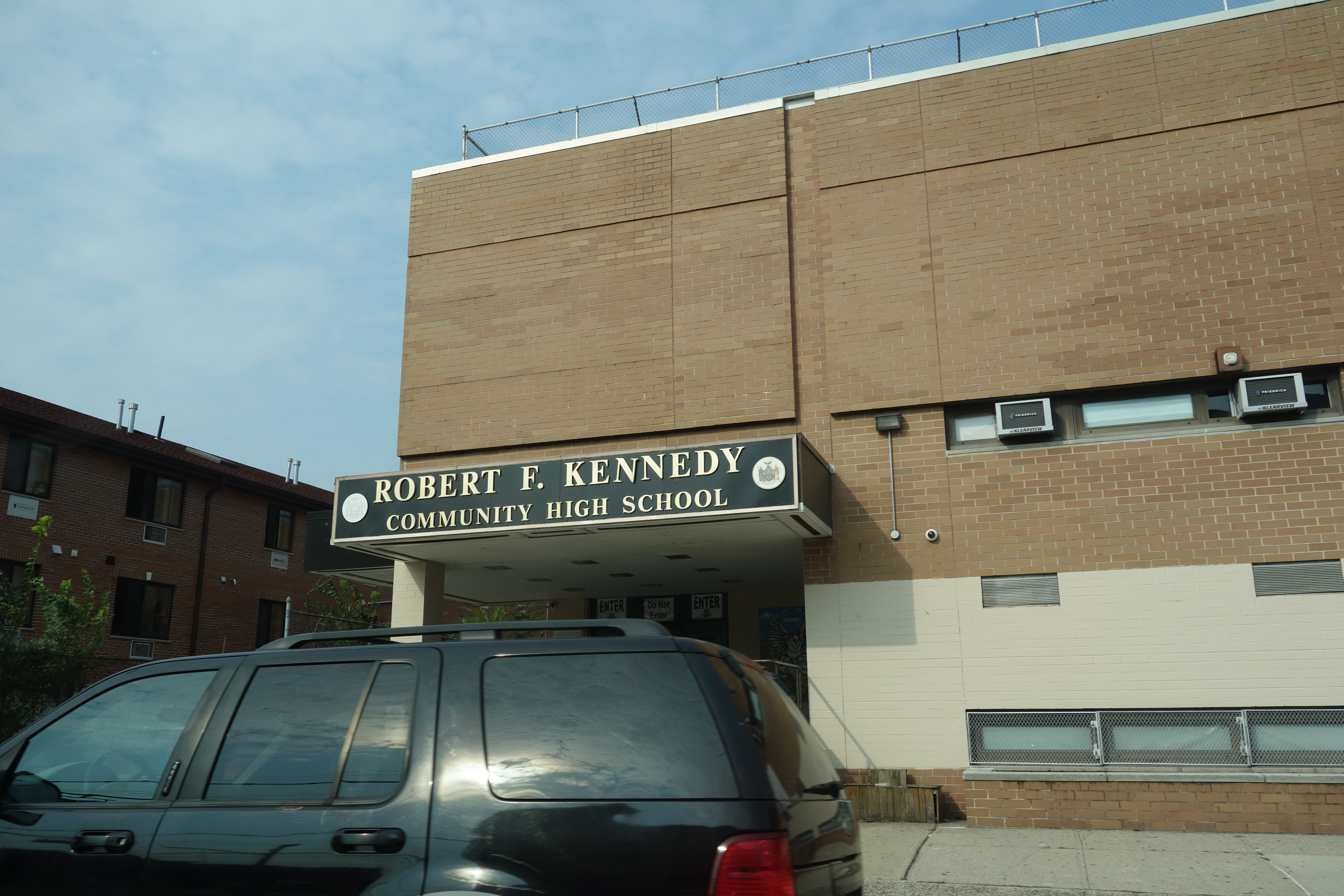

Location
- 75-40 Parsons Blvd. Flushing, NY. United States
- Coordinates: 40.72534°N 73.81101°W

Information
- Type: Public
- Established: 1992
- School district: New York City Department of Education
- Principal: Ignazio
- Grades: 9-12, Special Educations
- Color: Green
- Mascot: Panther
- Newspaper: rfkRecord

Robert F. Kennedy Community High School is a community public high school, residing in District 25 of the neighborhood of Kew Gardens Hills in Queens, NY. According to the New York City Board of Education, there are currently 731 students in enrollment. Priyanka Chopra Jonas attended the school in 1997.

History

RFK Community High School was founded in 1992 as part of the New York City public school system.

It was established during a period of educational reform, aimed at creating smaller, community-focused public high schools to provide personalized learning environments and better serve local students.

The school was designed to foster strong relationships between students and staff, reflecting the community-oriented legacy of Robert F. Kennedy.

== Athletic Program ==
RFK High runs an interscholastic program in the following sports:

- Girls' Basketball
- Co-Ed bowling
- Girls' Volleyball
- Co-Ed Fencing
- Boys' Basketball
- Girls' Tennis
- Co-Ed Golf
- Baseball
- Softball

== See also ==
- List of high schools in New York City – Queens
