= Alfred E. Smith Career and Technical Education High School =

Public school in New York City

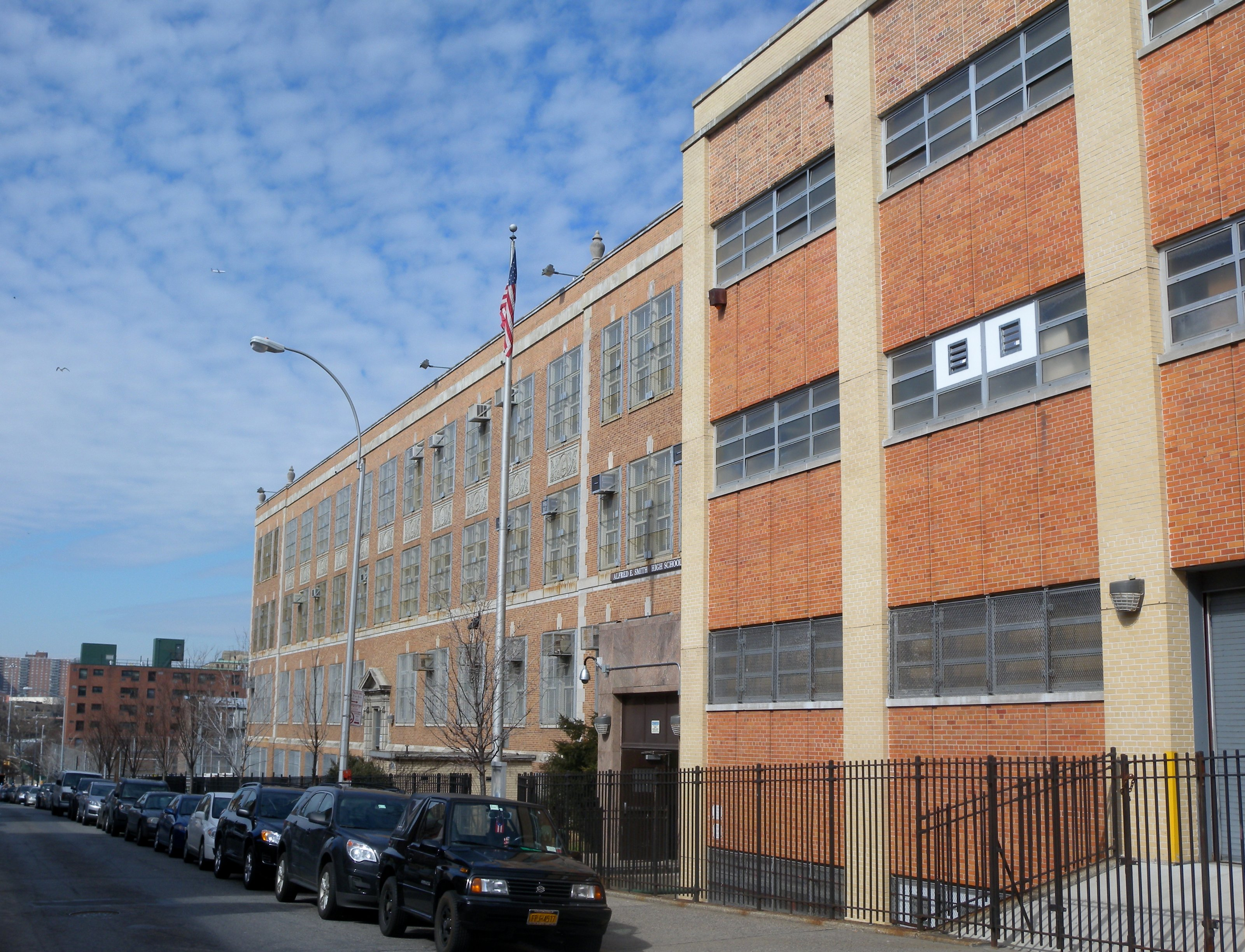

Location
- 333 E. 151 Street; The Bronx, New York; United States; 40°49′06″N 73°55′11″W

Information
- Type: Vocational public high school
- School board: New York City Public Schools
- School number: X600
- Principal: Evan Schwartz
- Faculty: 33.0 FTEs
- Grades: 9–12
- Enrollment: 444 (as of 2020-2021)
- Student to teacher ratio: 11.4:1
- Website: Official website

Alfred E. Smith Career and Technical Education High School is a vocational public high school in the South Melrose neighborhood of The Bronx, New York. It was originally built in the early 20th century as the "Bronx Continuation School" for students who left the school system. The school eventually became a vocational high school in the 1920s. The school was named after the former New York governor and Democratic nominee for president, Alfred E. Smith in 1965. Its address is 333 E. 151 Street. The school is near the Third Avenue and E. 149th Street station of the 2 and 5 IRT trains. The principal is Evan Schwartz.

This is the school at which Evan Hunter, then Salvatore Lombino, spent 17 days as a teacher in September 1950. The experience gave him the insights for his novel, "The Blackboard Jungle," (1954), written under the Hunter penname, which was adapted into the film, Blackboard Jungle (1955).

As of the 2014–15 school year, the school had an enrollment of 377 students and 33.0 classroom teachers (on an FTE basis), for a student–teacher ratio of 11.4:1. There were 315 students (83.6% of enrollment) eligible for free lunch and 23 (6.1% of students) eligible for reduced-cost lunch."

The school offers automotive, home construction, plumbing, and heating/air-conditioning ventilation programs. There are plenty of shops where students work on real cars brought in by people in the community. The school also has a room large enough for those studying carpentry to construct a full size wooden frame house.

The New York City Department of Education planned in 2010 to close the school but the plan was cancelled after strong protests from the community.

== See also ==
- List of high schools in New York City
