= Bushwick School for Social Justice =

Public school in New York City

Coordinates: 40°41′48.12″N 73°54′39.6″W

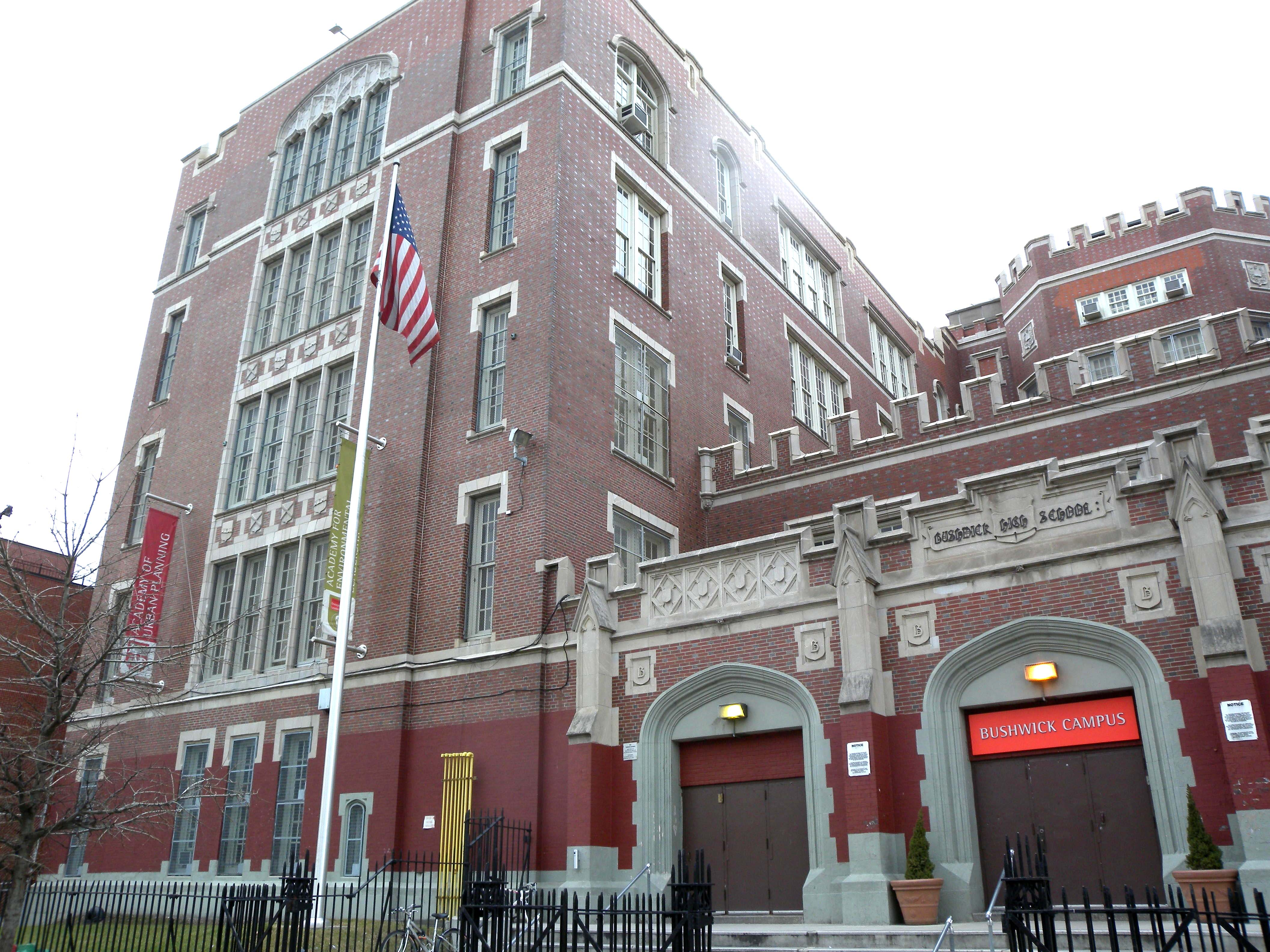

Location
- 400 Irving Avenue; Brooklyn, New York 11237

Information
- Headmaster: idalys Marhs

The Bushwick School for Social Justice (BSSJ) is a small public high school in the Bushwick neighborhood of Brooklyn, New York City, one of four schools currently occupying the Bushwick Campus. Enrollment is approximately 425 students. The school is partnered with Make the Road New York, Brooklyn College, and the Institute for Student Achievement (ISA). It was founded by Terry C. Byam, Matt Corallo, Matthew Ritter, and Mark Rush. It opened in 2003, graduated its first class in 2007, and has received an 'A' rating for five straight years. Terry C. Byam was the founding principal. The current principal is Ana Marsh.

== See also ==
- Thurgood Marshall Academy for Learning and Social Change
- New York City Department of Education
- List of high schools in New York City
