= Academy for Excellence in Leadership =

Public school in New York City

Location
- 400 Irving Avenue; Brooklyn, New York; United States
- Coordinates: 40°41′48.12″N 73°54′39.6″W

Information
- Type: Public,
- Established: 2006
- Founder: Nilda Gomez-Katz
- School board: New York City Public Schools
- NCES District ID: 3600097
- School number: 403
- NCES School ID: 360009705866
- Principal: ChántAndréa Blissett
- Faculty: 24.00 (on an FTE basis)
- Grades: 9–12
- Enrollment: 270 (2021-2022)
- Student to teacher ratio: 11.25 ratio
- Color: Green
- Mascot: Tiger
- Yearbook: AEL Yearbook
- Website: http://www.aelnyc.org

The Academy for Excellence in Leadership (AEL), formerly the Academy for Environmental Leadership, is a small high school located in the Bushwick neighborhood of Brooklyn in New York City. It was founded in September 2006, and is located on the 4th floor of the Bushwick High School Campus. The school has close to 285 students, spread out among four grades.

The partner organizations of the Academy for Excellence in Leadership include Advancement Via Individual Determination Brooklyn College, Brooklyn Library Connections Program, College Now, Guardian Life, Make the Road New York, Medger Evers College, Nature Conservancy, New York City College of Technology, SolarOne and Summer Search.

AEL offers Advanced Placement classes in Studio Art, English Language and Composition, English Literature and Composition, Biology, Government and Politics, and U.S. History.

As of the 2015–16 school year, the school had an enrollment of 279 students and 28.0 classroom teachers (on an FTE basis), for a student–teacher ratio of 12.4:1. There were 237 students (68.3% of enrollment) eligible for free lunch and 3 (0.9% of students) eligible for reduced-cost lunch.
