= Miraj Islamic School =

Coordinates: 40.63477°N 74.08593°W

Location
- 307 Victory Blvd; Staten Island, NY 10301; United States

Information
- Type: Private Islamic school
- Religious affiliation: Islam
- Established: 1999; 27 years ago
- NCES School ID: A0107707
- Principal: Lamiaa Refaey
- Gender: Mixed
- Enrollment: approx. 266
- Website: mirajschool.org

Miraj Islamic School is a private Islamic school and community center in Tompkinsville area of Staten Island, New York. The school opened its doors in 1999 to only a handful of students and now serves approximately 266 students from Pre-kindergarten through 12th grade. It graduated its first class in 2011 with 14 students.
