= Eden II School for Autistic Children =

American non-profit organization

Eden II School for Autistic Children Inc.
- Founded: 1976; 50 years ago
- Tax ID no.: 13-2872916
- Legal status: 501(c)(3) nonprofit organization
- Headquarters: Staten Island, New York, United States
- Region served: New York City and Long Island
- Board of directors: Michele Carr (Chair); Michael Arvanites (Vice-chair); Anthony Citarella (Treasurer); Shanx Ravisankar (Secretary); Stephanie Cassas; Denise Bianchi; Janet Barsky; Jim Caldarella; Anthony Castiglione; Darren DiPrima; Stephanie Dussel; William Juliano; Steve Kirschbaum; Brendan Lantry; David Memoli; Siobhan Domingo; Terry Tanangelo; Chris Ferrera; Chris Barnett; Louanne Haley; Denise Jordan; Malvina Krupatkik; Robert MacFayden
- Key people: Joanne Gerenser (Executive Director); Eileen Hopkins (Deputy Executive Director); Randy Horowitz (Associate Executive Director); Irene Cavanagh (Associate Executive Director); Mary McDonald (Associate Executive Director); Erin Archibald (Program Services Director)
- Affiliations: Foundation for the Advancement of Autistic Persons Inc.
- Revenue: $50,922,068 (Fiscal year ending June 30, 2025)
- Expenses: $49,411,616 (Fiscal year ending June 30, 2025)
- Staff: 859 (2024)
- Volunteers: 23 (Fiscal year ending June 30, 2025)
- Website: https://eden2.org

Eden II Programs is an American nonprofit organization founded in 1976, which aims to support autistic people throughout New York City and Long Island. Its support and educational methods are based on applied behavior analysis.

== History ==
Eden II was founded in November 15, 1976 by six families, initially beginning on Staten Island with six children and one special education teacher.

Eden II developed its adult services program in 1982 to meet the needs of autistic individuals who have aged out of the school system. This program is designed to serve those individuals with the most significant challenges, often excluded from all other options. Today, Eden II serves over 90 young people in its adult services programs.

Eden II developed its family support department in 1984. This program began with a small parent training class and some respite trips serving approximately 15 families a year and has grown into a combination of programs, including respite services, summer camp, afterschool programs, holiday trips, service coordination, and in-home habilitation programs. Currently, the family support department assists more than 200 families.

In 1994, Eden II opened its preschool program to serve autistic children, ages 3–5. This intensive program focuses on learning readiness, academics, and social and self-help skills.

The Genesis School, an educational annex of Eden II, opened in Plainview, New York in September 1995. Initially serving 12 students, the Genesis School now provides educational, residential and outreach services to more than 100 individuals throughout Long Island. Eden II employs more than 400 full-time and 200 part-time staff.

In July 2023, the Staten Island Advance reported that Eden II was experiencing severe funding and staffing challenges in the wake of the COVID-19 pandemic. Difficulties included having to terminate teaching and support staff who refused to comply with New York City's temporary COVID-19 vaccine mandate, uncompetitive reimbursement rates for teaching and support staff when compared to that offered by the New York City Department of Education, and a general shortage of teaching and support staff nationwide. During the pandemic, Eden II also experienced issues with students who were unable to effectively learn remotely and who had difficulty complying with mask mandates and other safety measures when returning to the classroom. Executive Director Joanne Gerenser told the publication, "When I lay it all out there, it’s a miracle we’re actually still running."

In February 2024, Eden II announced that ABA Centers of America founder Christopher Barnett had joined its board of directors.

In September 2026, Gerenser retired from her position as Eden II's executive director; she began working for the organization 44 years earlier as a speech-language pathologist, becoming executive director 12 years later.

=== Residence programs ===
In 1993, Eden II developed its first residence for 10 autistic young men. Eden II opened its second residence in 2003, serving six autistic children, and had opened three more residences by 2010.

=== Methods ===
All programs and schools operated by Eden II base their support and educational methods on applied behavior analysis, a controversial operant-conditioning system commonly marketed as an autism treatment within the United States and widely opposed within the autistic rights movement.
