= Diploma Plus =

American non-profit organization

Diploma Plus (DP) is an American non-profit organization whose mission is to improve graduation rates and post-secondary options for over-age and under-credited urban youth. The Diploma Plus model has been implemented in five geographical regions across the United States.

== History ==
Diploma Plus was developed by Commonwealth Corporation in 1996 as a response to the alarmingly high drop out rate and barriers to post-secondary success for urban youth of color, and the inadequate supply of high quality alternatives to traditional high schools. In 2003, Diploma Plus became part of the Association for High School Innovation, formerly the Alternative High School Initiative.

Since its launch in 1996, Diploma Plus has grown from a 100-student pilot at two sites in Boston, MA to an organization that, in 2009–10, enrolls over 3,400 students at 29 alternative high schools across the country.

== Operating model ==
Each Diploma Plus school is required to implement Four Essential components:

1. A performance based system that includes competency-based assessment and performance-based promotion
2. A supportive school culture that intentionally creates positive relationships among students, staff and parents/families
3. A Future Focus that provides post-secondary education preparation, career preparation and civic engagement opportunities
4. Effective internal and external capabilities to successfully implement the DP model.

Diploma Plus schools are generally much smaller in size and generally serve students who are beginning to age out of the traditional school system. Rather than grade levels, Diploma Plus students are placed into and promoted through three phases: foundation, presentation and plus. In each phase, students learn content and skills at an appropriate level, regardless of their age or previous credit accumulation.

Most sites in the Diploma Plus Network offer a three- to four-year program or study, and are either small, alternative high schools run by districts or are charter schools. Other Diploma Plus sites are district-supported alternative programs or programs implemented by community colleges in partnership with local school districts that serve students for shorter periods of time. Diploma Plus schools have the autonomy to uniquely design experiences that work for its student population's specific needs. An American Enterprise Institute for Public Policy Research report on the use of innovation in schools highlights this characteristic saying, "this means changing schedules, allowing for early-release time for working students, and using different kinds of teachers--all of which run up against traditional state and district rules".

== Educational impact ==
More than 83% of DP students are African American or Latino/Hispanic; more than 74% are eligible for the federally subsidized meal program. Students are accepted regardless of prior academic record, conduct, or socioeconomic background. When compared to schools with a similar student population, Diploma Plus schools tend to have higher attendance rates, retention rates and passing rates on state tests. According to Vicki L. Phillips, Director of Education and the Bill and Melinda Gates Foundation, Diploma Plus does this by "making academics more relevant and maintaining college-ready standards...for its students"

The Diploma Plus model has gained support as a dropout prevention program in several states and even at national level. In his pre-election Plan for Lifelong Success through Education, President Obama included Diploma Plus as one of two “Evidence-Based Models to Help Students Graduate”. Diploma Plus has also been endorsed by the American Youth Policy Forum and the National Dropout Prevention Center, which called it a "model" program.

Diploma Plus' dropout prevention model has also gained the attention of several states known to have notoriously poor graduation rates in their urban centers. The program was named a New Effective School Option in the National Governor's Association, "Achieving Graduation for All: A Governor’s Guide to Dropout Prevention and Recovery". Shortly after, in an article written by Gregory A. Ballard, Cory Booker and Karl Dean, respectively, the mayors of Indianapolis, Newark, New Jersey, and Nashville, Tennessee, Diploma Plus is identified as one model selected to partner with the public school system and focus on dropout prevention and recovery during the 2008–09 and 2009–10 school year.

== See also ==
- Public High School
