= Brooklyn Democracy Academy =

Public school in New York City

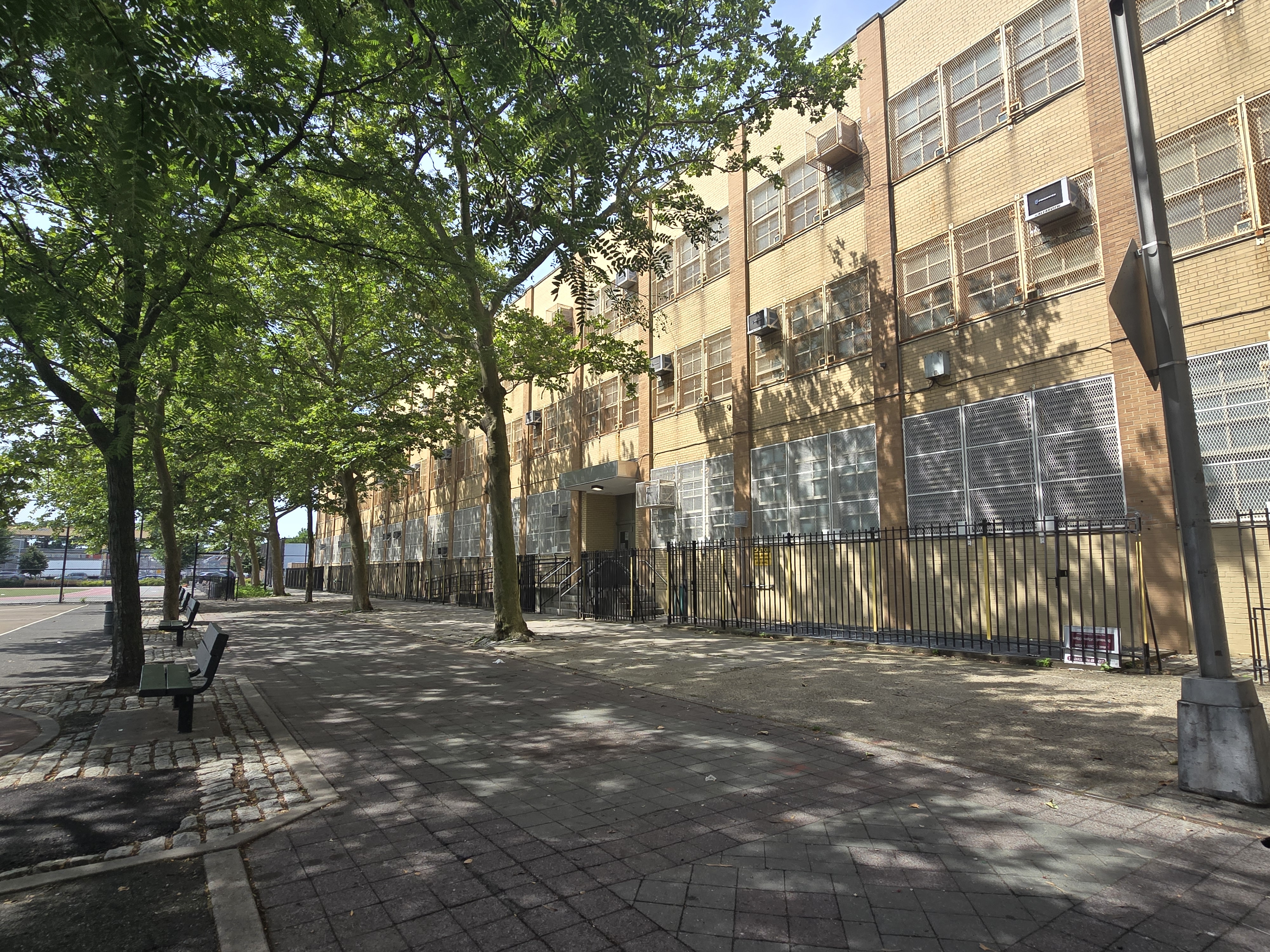

Location
- 985 Rockaway Ave; Brooklyn, Kings County, New York 11212; United States
- 40°39′21″N 73°54′25″W

Information
- NCES District ID: 3600121
- School code: NY-332300010000-332300011643
- NCES School ID: 360012105997
- Faculty: 17 (on an FTE basis)
- Grades: 9-12
- Enrollment: 140 (2022-2023)
  - Grade 9: 15
  - Grade 10: 44
  - Grade 11: 44
  - Grade 12: 36
- Student to teacher ratio: 8.24:1
- Campus type: City: large
- Website: www.brooklyndemocracyacademy.com

The Brooklyn Democracy Academy is a transfer school for over-age/under-credited students, located in the Brooklyn, New York City, New York, United States. The school is a collaboration between the New York City Department of Education and the Jewish Child Care Association (JCCA).

== Notable alumni ==
- Pop Smoke (1999 – 2020), rapper

== See also ==
- List of high schools in New York City
