= High School for Public Service: Heroes of Tomorrow =

Public school in New York City

- 600 Kingston Avenue; Brooklyn, New York; United States

Information
- Type: Public
- Established: 2003
- School board: New York City Public Schools
- School number: K546
- Principal: Sean Rice
- Grades: 9–12
- Enrollment: 402
- Website: highschoolforpublicservice.weebly.com

High School for Public Service: Heroes of Tomorrow is a New York City public high school in Brooklyn, New York, founded in 2003. In addition to its academic curriculum, HSPS encourages its students to become involved in their communities through public service learning. HSPS was awarded an 'A' by the New York City Department of Education for the 2009–2010 school year.

== Awards ==
- The High School for Public Service was named a 2010 National Title 1 Distinguished School for New York State.
- HSPS was ranked as a bronze medal by U.S. News & World Report
- NY Daily News Feature Articles on the HSPS Farm
- GrowNYC Blog, "29 Mini-Grants Awarded to NYC School Gardens!"
- New York Times, "Concrete Farm Grows Chard (Callaloo, Too)"
