= Aaron School =

Location
- 309 East 45th Street, between 1st and 2nd Avenue, 42 East 30th Street, between Park Avenue and Madison Avenue; New York, New York; United States; 40.7448°N 73.9837°W

Information
- Type: Private
- Established: 2002
- Director: Elizabeth Fay and Beth Fried
- Grades: K-12
- Student to teacher ratio: 12:2
- Website: aaronschool.org

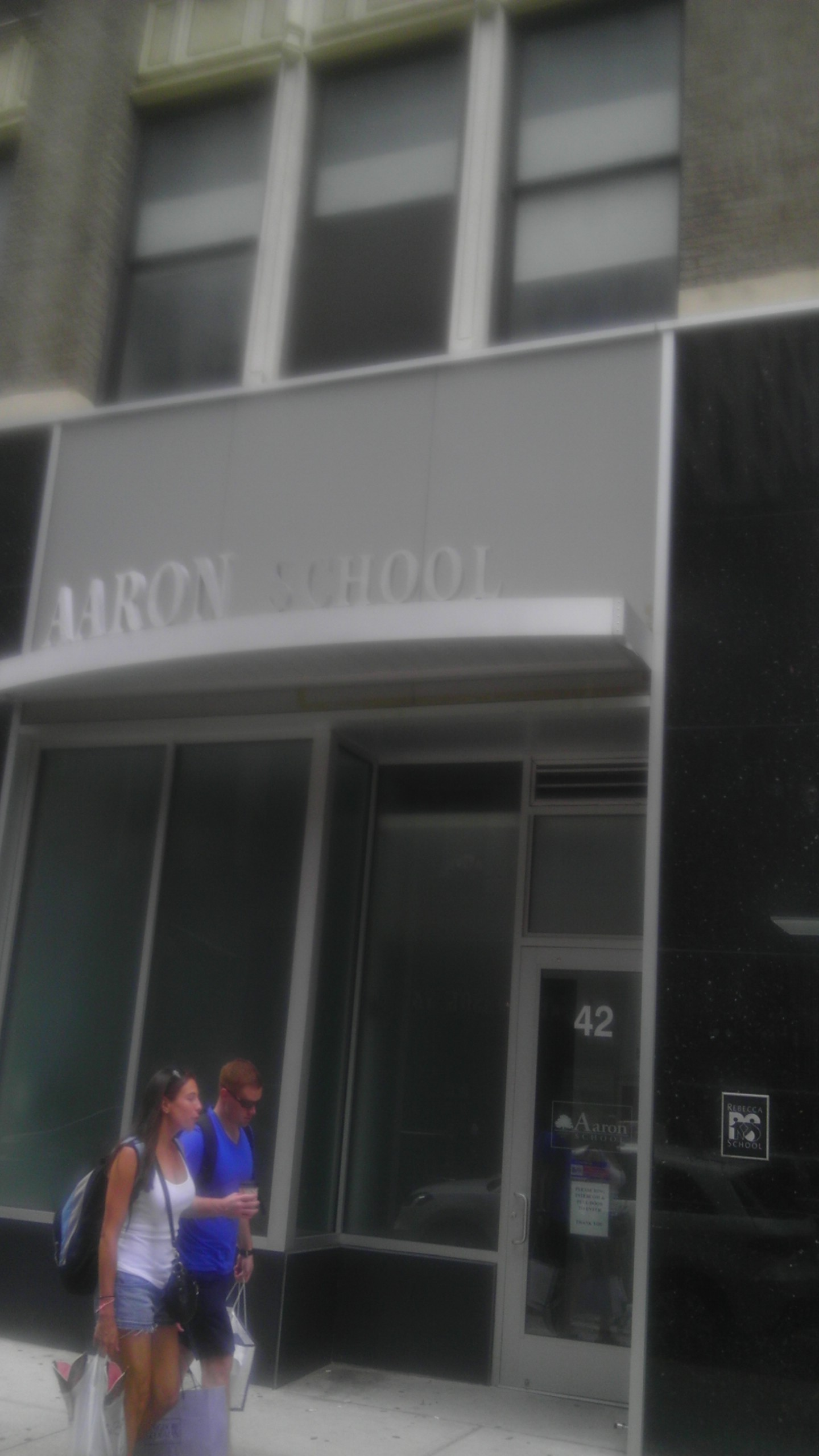
Aaron School 42 E30 St

Aaron School is a K–12 private special education school for children with learning disabilities, sensory and social challenges, located in New York City, United States, for students with average or above average cognitive ability. It provides a small, structured classroom setting with a multi-sensory, multi-disciplinary and strengths approach to learning. The students have challenges in the areas of reading, writing, mathematics, executive functioning, sensory and social challenges.

== History ==
The elementary school is located on East 45th street, between 1st and 2nd Avenue. In addition to its academic program, it offers a social skills program, art, music, physical education, sensory gym, computer lab and library. It also provides occupational therapy, speech therapy and psychological counseling.

The upper school, formerly Aaron Academy for teens in grades seven through twelve with learning disabilities, is located at 42 East 30th Street, between Park Avenue and Madison Avenue. In 2009 the tuition at Aaron Academy was $45,500 a year.

== Curriculum ==
Aaron School in New York City uses a method the school calls "Dual CORE Curriculum," which uses principles of "Universal Design for Learning." The school says this allows for multiple methods of presentation, participation and expression. This CORE method focuses on student's strengths, rather than the more traditional method of focusing on the deficiencies of students with learning disabilities.

In addition to its CORE curriculum, Aaron School offers elective areas of study, including science, technology, engineering, mathematics, culinary arts, music, library and art. The school has a new gymnasium and athletic spaces, and performing arts spaces that opened in the fall of 2011.

Aaron School is one of a number of private, for-profit schools in New York City that are owned by New Story, a private, proprietary provider of school-based education services. Another school under the New Story network is Rebecca School.
