= South Brooklyn Community High School =

Public school in New York City

Coordinates: 40°40′41″N 74°00′51″W

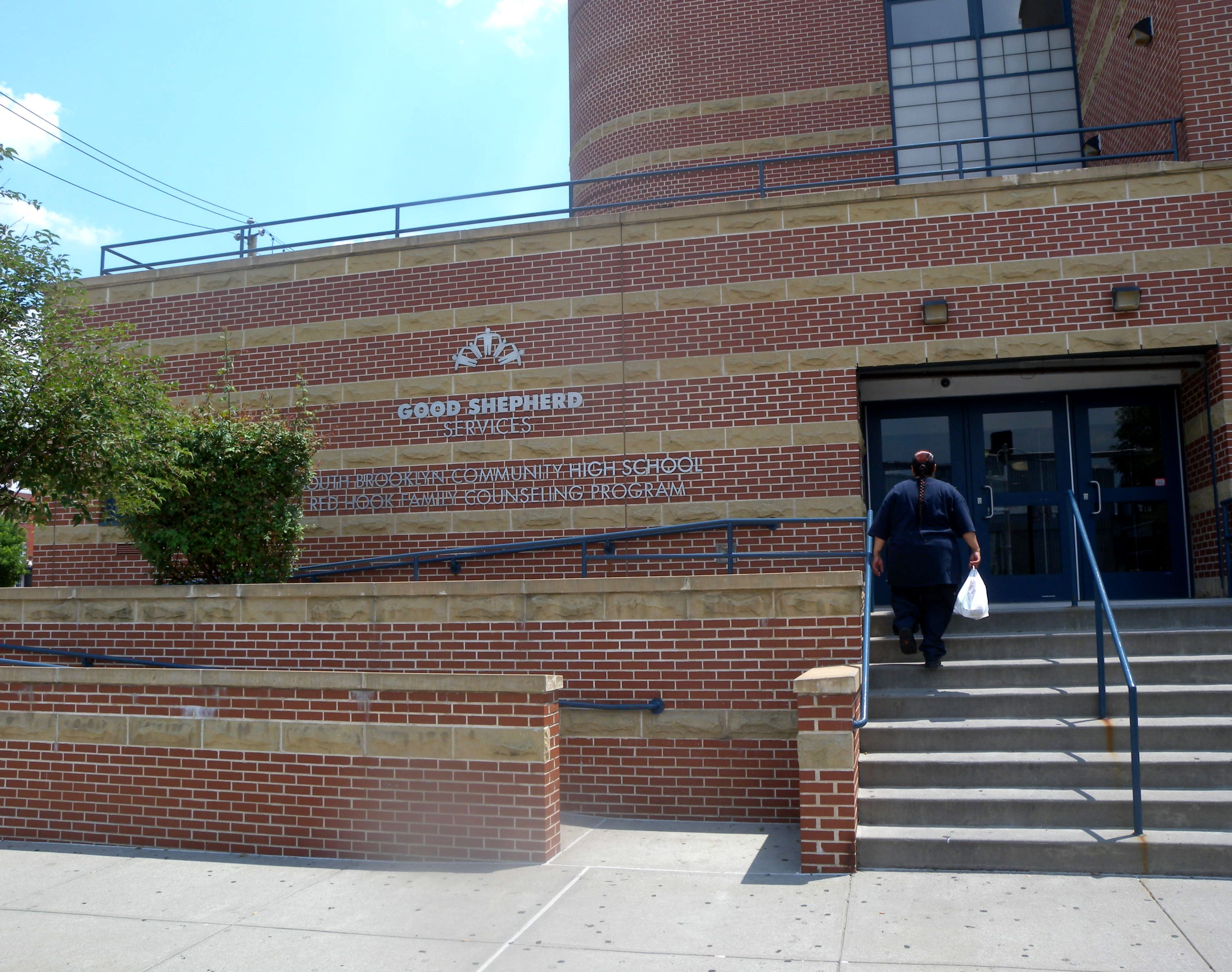
173 Conover Street

South Brooklyn Community High School (SBCHS) is a public transfer high school in Red Hook, Brooklyn offering students who are truant or have dropped out a second chance to earn a high school diploma

The school is a partnership between the NYCDOE and Good Shepherd Services, a youth development, education and family service agency.
