= Brooklyn Preparatory High School =

Public school in New York City

Coordinates: 40.7154°N 73.9550°W

Location
- Brooklyn, New York; United States

Information
- Type: High school
- Grades: 9-12
- Enrollment: c. 500
- Website: www.brooklynprephs.org

Brooklyn Preparatory High School is a 9-12th grade college-focused public high school in Brooklyn, New York. It has 500 students enrolled.

== Academics ==
As Brooklyn Prep is a college prep high school, students take four years of the major core subjects, and are provided opportunities for Advanced Placement and elective courses as well.

=== Senior Capstone ===
Senior Capstone is a course designed to build college level reading, writing and discussion for senior students. During the first semester, students study topics in government and economics, choosing their own case studies. The second semester, students research a relevant topic of their choosing, write an academic research paper, and present their research to the school community.
