= Academy of Urban Planning =

Public school in New York City

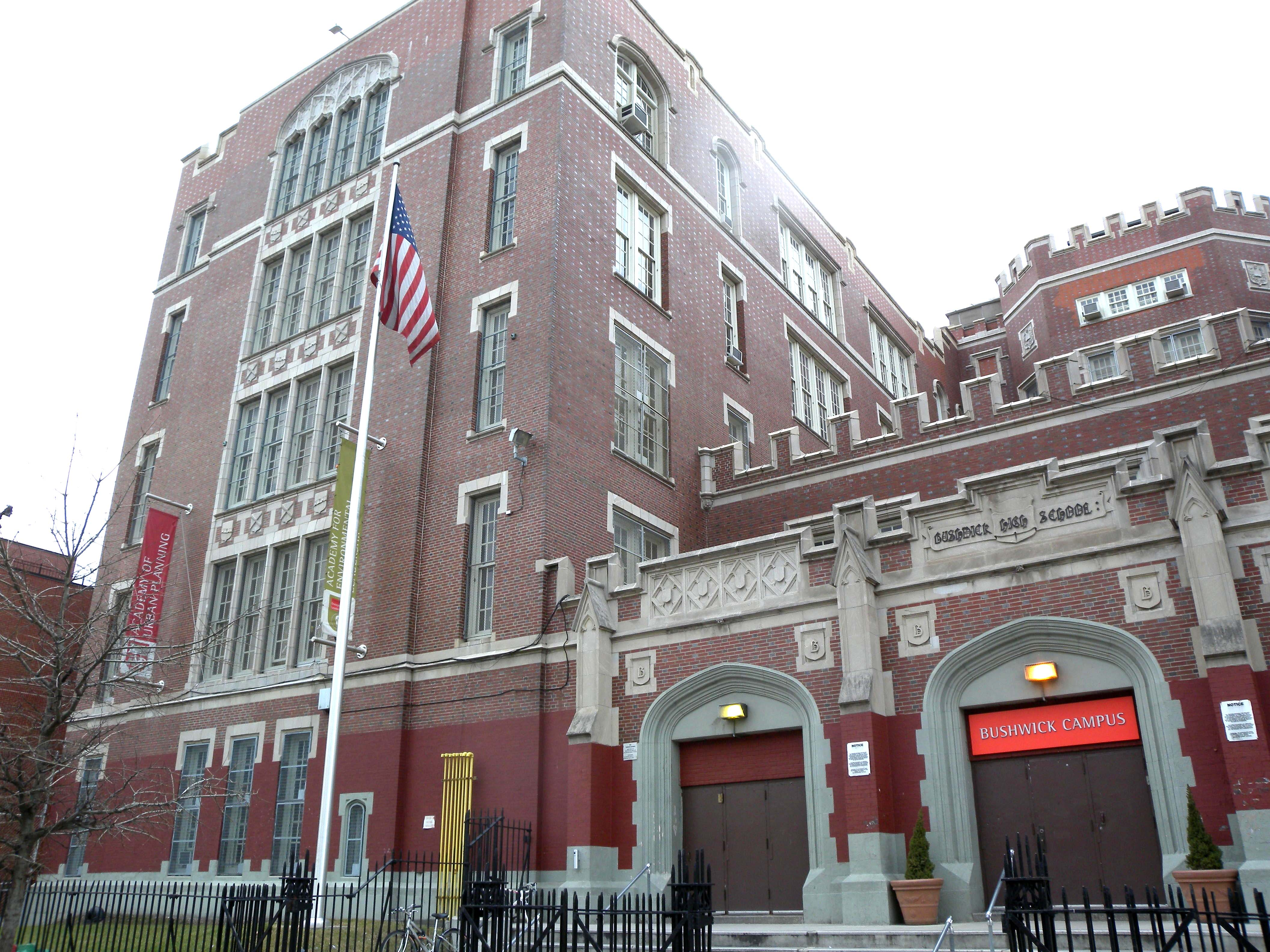

Location
- 400 Irving Avenue; Brooklyn, New York; United States
- Coordinates: 40°41′49″N 73°54′43″W

Information
- Type: Public high school
- Established: 2003
- School board: New York City Public Schools
- School number: K552
- Principal: Jorge Sandoval
- Faculty: 21.8 FTEs
- Grades: 9–12
- Enrollment: 280 (as of 2014-15)
- Student to teacher ratio: 12.8:1
- Website: http://schools.nyc.gov/schoolportals/32/k552/default.htm

Academy of Urban Planning (AUP) is a small public high school in Brooklyn, New York on the campus of Bushwick High School. It shares a building with Academy of Environmental Leadership, Bushwick School for Social Justice, and New York Harbor School.

== Establishment ==
It was established in 2003 as a partnership between the New York City Department of Education and New Visions for Public Schools, a nonprofit organization promoting educational reform. Funded by the Bill and Melinda Gates Foundation, New Visions transformed failing New York City high schools into smaller, more specialized learning communities.

AUP was founded by parents, teachers, students and staff from the school's lead partner, Center for the Urban Environment.

== Statistics ==
As of the 2014–15 school year, the school had 280 students and 21.8 classroom teachers (on an FTE basis), for a student–teacher ratio of 12.8:1. 267 students (95.4% of enrollment) were eligible for free lunch and 8 (2.9% of students) for reduced-cost lunch.

== Curriculum ==
Through the school's theme of urban planning, students take a sequence of courses including art, architecture and urban design, urban sociology, Geographic Information Systems and a senior seminar in democracy and leadership. The school also offers advanced placement courses in English literature, statistics, human geography and Latino studies. AUP offers students the opportunity to participate in the arts, community service, mentoring, college planning and community advocacy.

== Recognition ==
AUP has been featured in local and national media including MTV's Thinkover Your School, U.S. News & World Report, New York Daily News, Newsday, The Bushwick Observer, EL Diario and News 12. In 2005, AUP received the William H. T. Whyte award for innovation in urban planning. AUP students' work has been exhibited at the Municipal Art Society and the Brooklyn Historical Society.
