= Celia Cruz Bronx High School of Music =

Public school in New York City

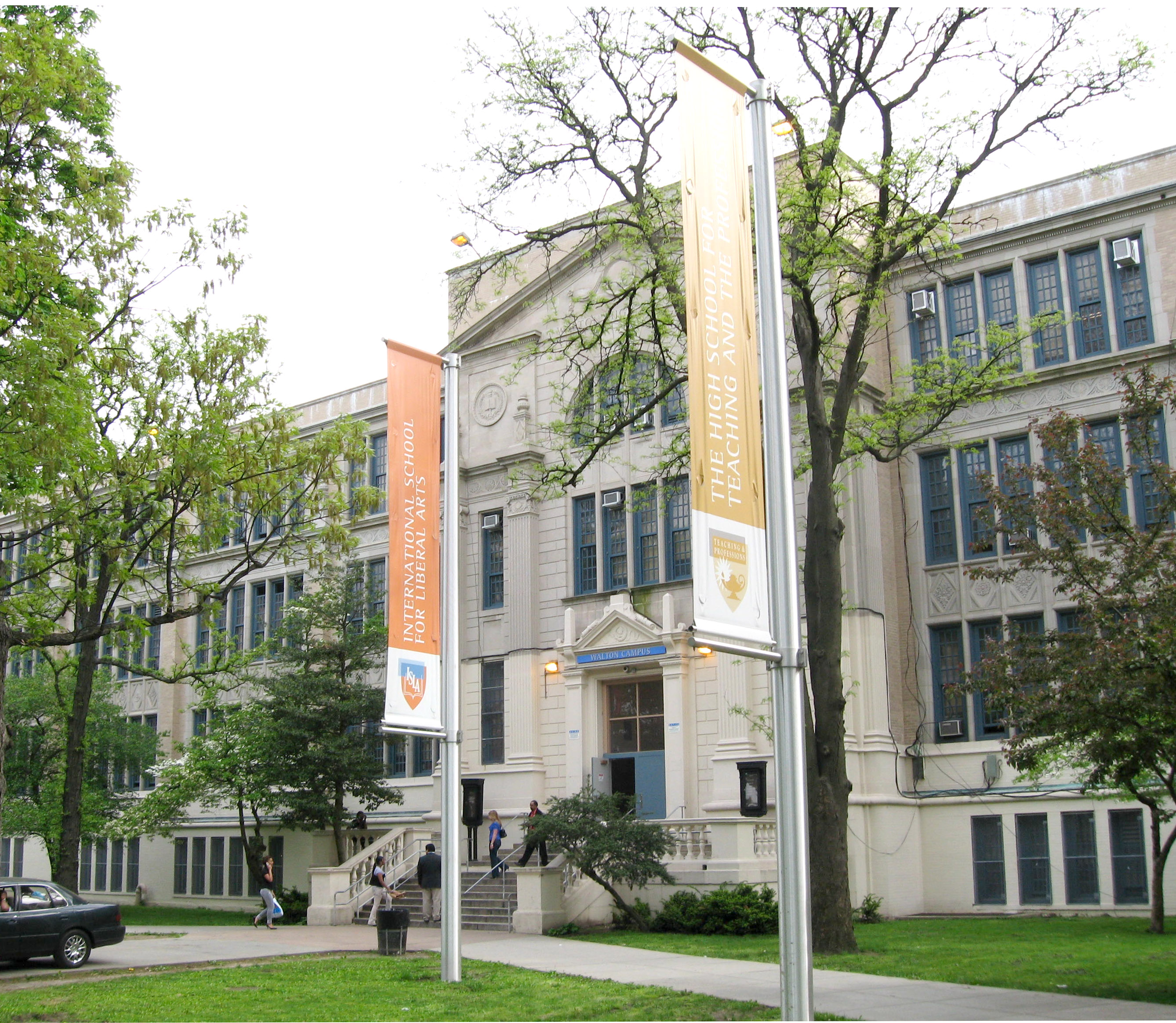

Location
- 2780 Reservoir Ave; Bronx, New York 10468; United States
- Coordinates: 40°52′13″N 73°53′50″W

Information
- Type: Public
- Established: 2003
- School district: New York City Geographic District #10
- Superintendent: Fred Walsh
- NCES School ID: 360008705556
- Principal: Jerrod Mabry
- Teaching staff: 35.65 (on an FTE basis)
- Grades: 9-12
- Enrollment: 415 (2022-2023)
- Student to teacher ratio: 11.64
- Campus: City: Large
- Colors: Black, Blue and Silver
- Newspaper: The Owl
- Website: www.celiacruzschool.org

Celia Cruz Bronx High School of Music (CCBXHSM) is the first comprehensive high school of music in the Bronx, New York, United States. The current principal is David Fink serving as Interim Acting Principal,who became principal in 2025 after having taught History and acted as Assistant Principal since the school opened in 2003. Fink replaced the founding principal, Dr. William Rodriguez, upon his retirement.

The school boasts a graduation rate of over 90%, with high rates of college enrollment among graduating students. This is compared to the NYC graduation rate of 64.7% in June 2013.

For the second time in ten years, the Celia Cruz Bronx High School of Music was rated as a "Best High School" by U.S. News & World Report, earning a silver rating.

== History ==
CCBXHSM opened in 2003 inside DeWitt Clinton High School. With a freshman class of just over 90 students, the school had four classrooms and two offices inside Clinton, and an office, a choral room, a storage closet, and use of the band room at Lehman College. The school now has half of the top floor of the Walton Campus building.

During its first school year, CCBXHSM performed for various constituencies such as the Chancellor Joel Klein, Pedro Knight (husband of Celia Cruz), Mayor Michael Bloomberg, and FAME. They also performed in Lincoln Center and in CitiGroup Jazz Festivals. Their annual winter and spring concerts are held in the Lovinger Theater in Lehman College.

Halfway into its first year, CCBXHSM received news that the school was to be relocated from Clinton High School to the Walton Campus. The school began its second year on the third floor of the Walton Campus.

On August 21, 2003, the mayor held a news conference in Lehman College, renaming the Bronx High School of Music to the Celia Cruz Bronx High School of Music.

== Exploring the Arts ==
The Celia Cruz Bronx High School of Music is a partner school with Exploring the Arts, an organization created by Tony Bennett and his wife Susan Benedetto to support music programs throughout the city. They provide a series of professional development opportunities to enhance music programs as well as scholarships and internship opportunities for students. Bennett and Benedetto recently visited the school to hear a student recital. The partnership has also resulted in the writing of new academic curricula, such as the Physics of Music.

== CCBXHSM today ==
Today the Celia Cruz Bronx High School of Music is at its full capacity of 450 students. Competition for entry into the school has grown as well.

In addition to a strong and rigorous academic program, there is an intense music program. There are three types of ensembles in CCBXHSM: Choir, Orchestra, and Band. Within these are subdivisions. Students with vocal abilities, for example, go into a freshman choir during their first year. Then, if they have passed all of their classes, they audition to be placed in either Bella Voce, Mixed Choir, Stage Choir or the Sweet Out-of-Lines for their second year. String students go into Freshman Orchestra for their first year, then audition for either Concert or Chamber Orchestra. With the band, students go to Freshman Band during their first year, then audition for either Wind Ensemble or Symphonic Band for their sophomore, junior, and senior year.

CCBXHSM offers a variety of extracurricular activities open to students passing all of their classes, including:

- Jazz Band
- Latin Band
- Octave Below
- Robotics
- Quintent
- Midori lessons
