= Renaissance Charter School (Queens) =

Public school in New York City

The Renaissance Charter School
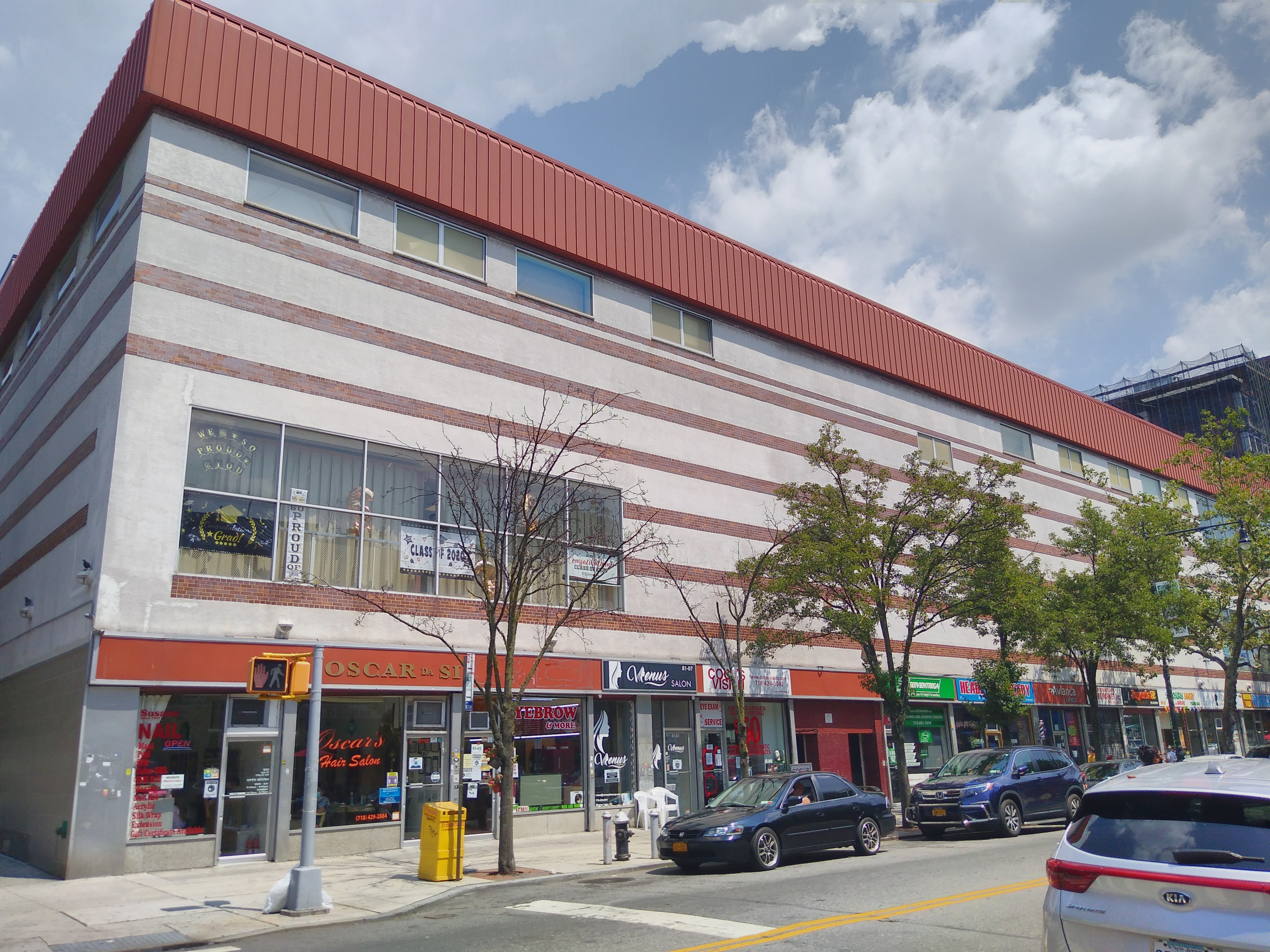

Location
- 35–59 81st Street; Queens, New York 11372; United States; 40.7499°N 73.8852°W

Information
- Type: Charter
- Motto: Developing Leaders for the Renaissance of New York
- Established: 1993
- NCES School ID: 360005904803
- Principal: Stacey Gauthier
- Faculty: 39.39 (on FTE basis)
- Grades: K–12
- Enrollment: ~590 (2019–20)
- Student to teacher ratio: 13.91:1
- Website: rencharters.org

Renaissance Charter School in New York City opened in 1993 and is authorized by the Chancellor of the New York City Department of Education. It houses 550 students in grades kindergarten through high school. It started as a first-generation "New Visions School" sponsored by New Visions for Public Schools. It is located in the Jackson Heights neighborhood of Queens. In 2000 it converted to charter status, one of the first charter schools in New York City. The current principal is Stacey Gauthier.

== History ==
In 1991 New Visions for Public Schools (originally named "The Fund for New York City Public Education"), in conjunction with then-Chancellor Joseph Fernandez, issued an RFP asking community groups to submit proposals for innovative schools. The proposal for The Renaissance School was submitted by "The Committee of Concerned Educators" and Community School District 30; it was one of 16 accepted proposals from nearly 300 submissions. The proposal for the school was written in fictional narrative form chronicling a tour of the school by prospective parents.

The school opened with 130 students, grades 4–7, in September 1993, in one wing of JHS 204 in Long Island City. In 1995, it expanded to grades K and 6–9, and moved to the site of the St. Patrick's parish school which had closed the prior year. In 1996, it expanded to grades K–10 and moved into a permanent leased space on 37th Avenue in Jackson Heights, then became Renaissance Charter School, one of the first five charter schools in New York, in 2000.

== Model ==
Renaissance Charter School was chosen as the site for a 2003 press conference held by then-mayor Michael Bloomberg announcing and expansion of charter schools, in which he labeled Renaissance as "a charter school that works." The Renaissance model has several components.

- Its motto is "Developing Leaders for the Renaissance of New York". Curriculum and programs help students develop leadership skills.
- It is one of only two New York City public schools that house grades K–12 under one roof.
- Its curriculum emphasizes the study of New York with a strong focus on geography education
- There is a norm of collaborative leadership among teachers, administrators, parents and students.

== Recognition ==
Geography Education:

- Renaissance was issued a 2009–2010 citation from New York State Assemblyman Jose Peralta honoring students’ increased geographic literacy and global awareness.
- Renaissance received one of three 2009 competitive grants from the National Geographic Foundation to lead a consortium of educational institutions across the country, across charter and regular public schools, to create and implement a model program for K–12 geography education called "Matrix Geography."
- Founding Principal Monte Joffee and current principal Stacey Gauthier both received Geographic Educators of the Year Awards from the Hunter College Department of Geography.

School Leadership in the New York City School Reform Movement:

- Renaissance was awarded the 2008 Partnership Award by the United Federation of Teachers Officers and Executive Board to honor its model of successful partnership forged between administrators and educators.
- Renaissance led a consortium of NYC charter schools that wrote and received a 2008-2010 federal Charter School Dissemination Grant that created a program for generating and implementing peer-reviewed learning experiences.
- Renaissance co-sponsored a consortium between The College of Saint Rose and the Center for Integrated Teacher Education that created a principal certification program for educators who specifically hope to lead small and charter schools, 2005–2006.
- Renaissance has modeled and served as a laboratory for numerous school operators and prospective charter schools.
- Received a Special Citation from the Blackboard Awards for Excellence in Education in 2005 and 2013.

Education for Global Citizenship:

- Renaissance won the 2008 Imagination Award in the middle and high-school category from the Lincoln Center Institute to honor imaginative thinking in the teaching & learning practice of New York City public schools.
- United Nations Under-Secretary Anwarul K. Chowdhury commended Renaissance students and staff for their month-long facilitation of the “Building a Culture of Peace for the Children of the World” exhibition at the United Nations, March 2004.
