= The Kurt Hahn Expeditionary Learning School =

Public school in New York City

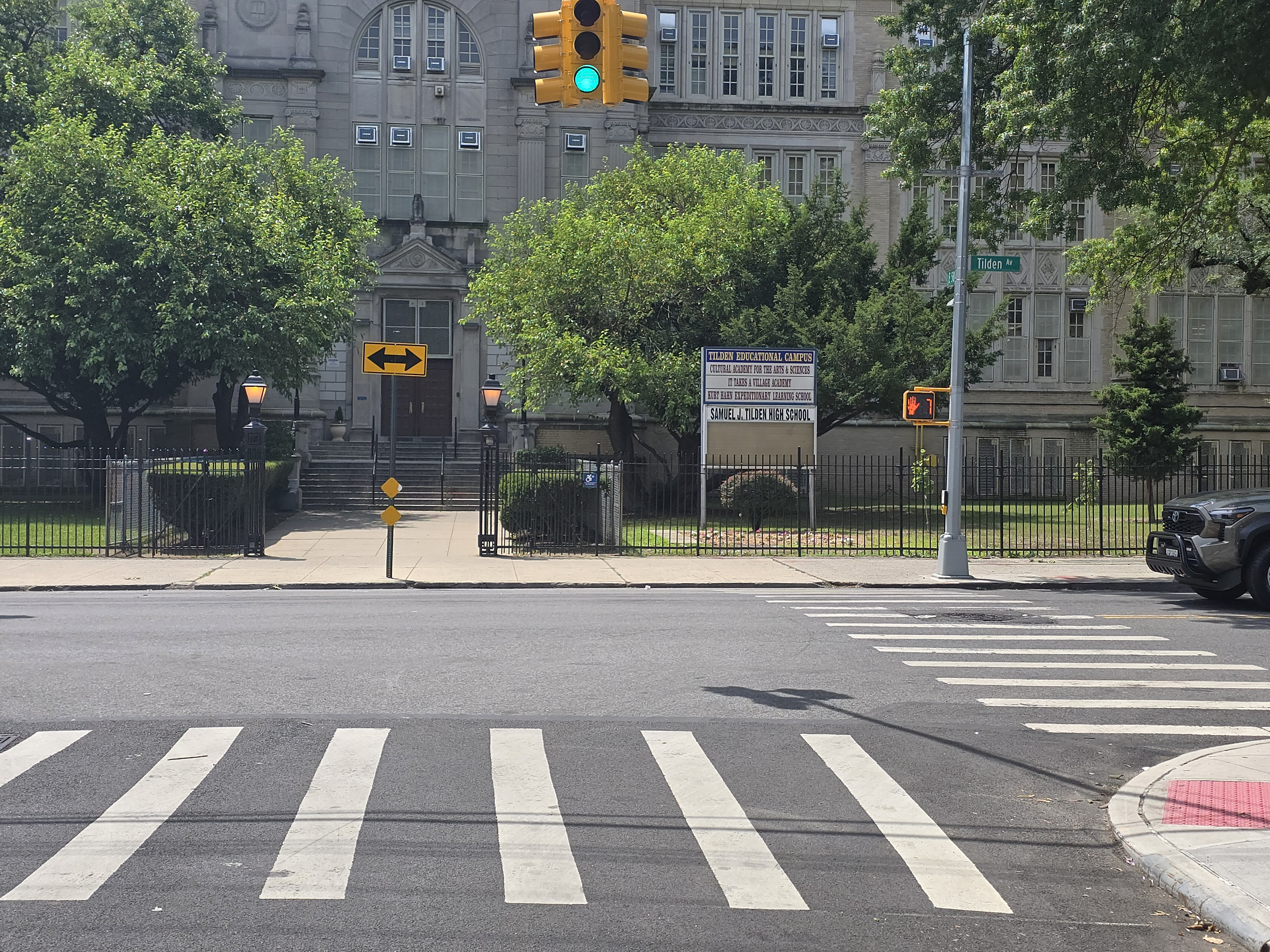

Location
- 5800 Tilden Avenue, Floor 2 Brooklyn, New York 11203; United States
- 40°38′53.37″N 73°55′20.1″W

Information
- Type: Public
- Motto: To serve, to strive, and not to yield.
- Established: 2007
- School district: New York City Department of Education
- Principal: Jessica Jean-Marie
- Grades: 9-12
- Enrollment: 369+
- Affiliation: New York City Outward Bound
- Website: kurthahnschool.org

The Kurt Hahn Expeditionary Learning School (the Kurt Hahn School) is a New York City public school working in partnership with New York City Outward Bound and Expeditionary Learning. Ms. Jessica Jean-Marie is the principal.

== History ==
=== Founding ===
The school was founded in 2007. It opened in the Tilden Educational Complex (see Samuel J. Tilden High School) in East Flatbush, New York. During the first year, the school had only 70 9th graders.

=== Kurt Hahn ===
Kurt Hahn was the founder of several innovative and successful educational programs, among them Outward Bound and the United World Colleges.

== Academics ==
=== Expeditionary learning ===
Expeditionary Learning, is core to the school model. The school holds the following as key commitments:
I. Learning Expeditions
II. Active Pedagogy
III. Culture & Character
IV. Leadership & School Improvement
V. School Structures

== Extracurriculars ==
Through a partnership with Publicolor, students from all schools on the Tilden Educational Campus united to repaint the facility in 2009.

== Notable teachers and faculty ==
Founding principal, Matt Brown, was cited as the "most trustworthy principal in Brooklyn" based on survey results from the New York City Department of Education's Learning Environment Survey for the 2007-2008 school year. He was replaced by in September 2014 by Ms. Veronica Coleman taking his place. Jessica Jean-Marie is now Principal of the School.

== See also ==
- Kurt Hahn
- Expeditionary learning schools
