= High School for Arts and Business =

Public school in New York City

Location
- 105-25 Horace Harding Expressway; Corona, New York 11368; United States
- Coordinates: 40.737258°N 73.8532°W

Information
- Type: Public
- Established: 1997
- School district: New York City Department of Education
- School number: Q550
- NCES School ID: 360009803154
- Principal: Ana Zambrano-Burakov
- Teaching staff: 50.50 (on an FTE basis)
- Grades: 9-12
- Enrollment: 755 (2022-2023)
- Student to teacher ratio: 14.95
- Campus: City: Large
- Colors: Blue and White
- Athletics conference: PSAL
- Mascot: Bulls
- Website: www.highschoolforartsandbusiness.org

High School for Arts and Business is a public high school in New York City, in Corona in the borough of Queens. The school once belonged to the Andrew Jackson High System and was named as an offsite section in 1973.

== Facilities ==
HSAB's building was previously a bowling alley. It was first used as a school on February 1, 1973 when it became the Newtown High School Annex.
