= Baccalaureate School for Global Education =

Public school in New York City

Coordinates: 40°45′18″N 73°55′37″W

Baccalaureate School for Global Education (BSGE)
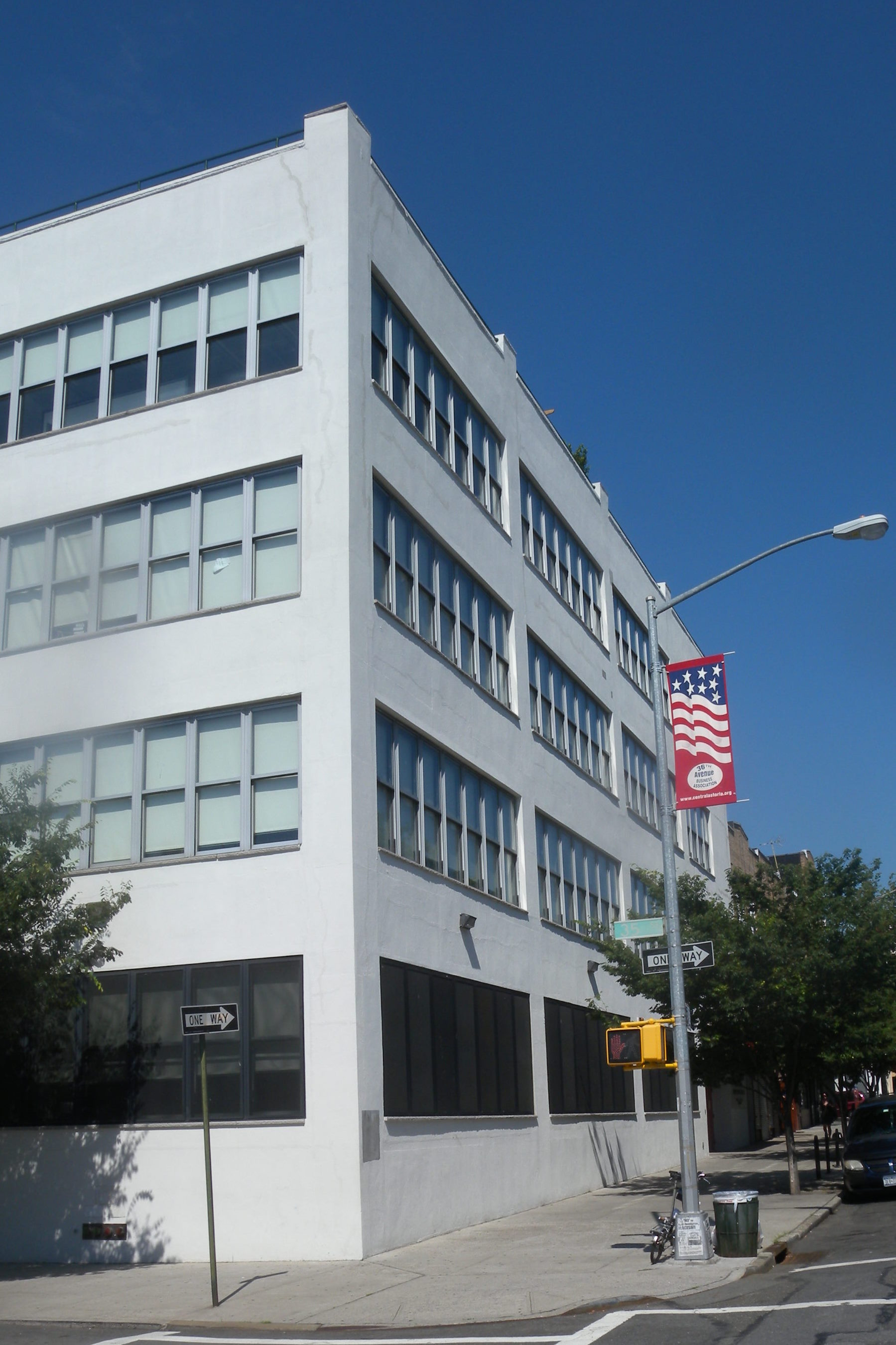

Location
- 34-12 36th Avenue; Astoria, New York 11106; United States

Information
- Type: Public International Baccalaureate high school
- Established: 2002
- Founder: Bill Stroud
- Status: Open
- Oversight: New York City Department of Education
- School number: 580
- Principal: Dr. Heather Page
- Faculty: 39.56 (on an FTE basis)
- Grades: 7 to 12
- Gender: Coeducational
- Enrollment: 530 (as of 2021–21)
- Student to teacher ratio: 13.4:1
- Colors: Blue; White
- Mascot: Sting
- Nickname: Sting
- National ranking: 32
- Newspaper: "The BaccRag"
- Yearbook: "Unscripted"
- Tuition: Free (government funded)
- Admissions: Competitive Examination
- Website: http://www.bsge.org

The Baccalaureate School for Global Education (BSGE) is a New York City public high school located in the Astoria section of Queens, New York. BSGE was established in 2002. It serves a student body of about 580 students between the 7th and 12th grades. The school is authorized by the International Baccalaureate Organization to offer both the MYP (IB Middle Years Programme) and also the IB Diploma Programme rather than the Standard State Curriculum, called the New York Regents, along with AP exams for regular public schools. As per the U.S. News 2025 High School Ranking, BSGE was ranked #286 in the nation, and ranked #38 in New York. Applicants formally were required to succeed in an admission test along with satisfaction of other requirements according to the grade entered. However, this form of admissions was phased out for fully screened admissions in both the Middle School and High School programs.

As of the 2023 school year, the school had an enrollment of 530 students and 39.56 classroom teachers (on an FTE basis), for a student–teacher ratio of 17.4:1. There were 222 students (41.9% of enrollment) eligible for free lunch and 35 (6.6% of students) eligible for reduced-cost lunch.
