= International High School at Prospect Heights =

Public school in New York City

Location
- 883 Classon Avenue; Brooklyn, New York 11225; United States
- Coordinates: 40°40′11.45″N 73°57′39.72″W

Information
- School district: New York City DOE District 17
- School number: K524
- Principal: Nedda De Castro
- Teaching staff: 29.3 (FTE) (as of 2007-08)
- Grades: 9-12
- Enrollment: 417 (as of 2007-08)
- Student to teacher ratio: 14.2 (as of 2007-08)
- Website: www.ihsph.org

International High School at Prospect Heights (school code: K524) is one of four schools on the former Prospect Heights High School campus in Brooklyn, New York. An Empowerment School, International High addresses the needs of recent immigrant students by teaching them fluency in reading, writing and speaking.

The International High School at Prospect Heights opened its doors to its first class in 2004, under the leadership of Alexandra Anormaliza.

The book The New Kids: Big Dreams and Brave Journeys at a High School for Immigrant Teens was written about students at the school.

== Extracurricular activities ==
The International High School at Prospect Heights offers students many extracurricular activities such as: African Club, French Club, Haitian Club, Latino/Spanish Club, Science Club, Drama Club, Guitar Ensemble, etc.

The school also has a prom, which is an unfamiliar concept for some students as of 2008.
