= Brooklyn Academy of Science and the Environment =

Public school in New York City

Coordinates: 40°40′12″N 73°57′41″W

Brooklyn Academy of Science and the Environment (BASE)
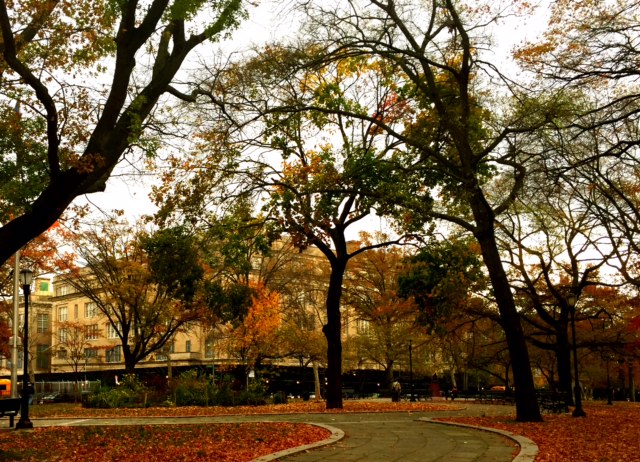

Location
- 883 Classon Ave, 5th Fl; Brooklyn, New York 11225; United States

Information
- School type: Public secondary
- Established: 2003
- Founder: Ibrahim Abdul-Matin
- School district: New York City Department of Education
- School number: K547
- Principal: Sara Stoler
- Faculty: 29
- Grades: 9-12
- Enrollment: 405
- Student to teacher ratio: 16:1
- Athletics conference: PSAL
- Website: wwww.basehighschool.org

Brooklyn Academy of Science and the Environment, or BASE, is one of four public high schools in the Prospect Heights Educational Campus (formerly Prospect Heights High School). BASE was established in 2003: a partnership among the Prospect Park Alliance, the Brooklyn Botanic Garden, and environmentalist and journalist Ibrahim Abdul-Matin. Students participate in "field studies" at the Brooklyn Botanic Garden, complementing classroom education about science, nature, and the environment.

== Education ==
The school offers a variety of advanced placement courses, electives, enrichment and internship opportunities, as well as enrollment in college courses at Medgar Evers College through CUNY College Now. It shares resources, including a swimming pool, library, athletic teams, and school-based service providers, with the larger Prospect Heights Educational Campus. The typical schedule for a 9th grader is 8:35am – 3:22pm.

=== Admissions ===
BASE is a limited unscreened school with priority given to Brooklyn students or residents who attend an information session. In 2016 it had approximately four applicants per seat.

== Recognitions ==
- 100 Schools Project Targets Early Detection of Mental Health and Substance Abuse Issues Among Teens, JewishBoard.org, September 2016.
- 5 Black Environmentalists Making History in Energy and Sustainability, EcoTech Institute, February 9, 2016.
- "Science Identity Transformations through Place-Based Teaching and Learning in the Natural World", graduate dissertation by Amy DeFelice, 2014.
- $74M Lakeside Complex Brings Year-Round Skating to Prospect Park, DNA Info, December 18, 2013.
- "City to Expand AP Classes to Bridge Racial Gap, Voices of NY, October 1, 2013
- New York City students spend summer in suburban Connecticut, August 4, 2012
- "Standing O", High schooler Lima Hossain of the Brooklyn Academy of Science and the Environment took first place at the Brooklyn College Science Research Day", Brooklyn Daily, July 5, 2012.
- ‘My Family Has High Hopes for Me Because They Know I’m Going to Do Great Things.’, New York Times, September 16, 2007.
- An Environmental Partnership: Groundswell partnered with the Brooklyn Museum and the Brooklyn Academy of Science and the Environment (BASE) to create a mural, 2005.
