= Williamsburg High School for Architecture and Design =

Public school in New York City

The Williamsburg High School For Architecture And Design

Location
- 257 North 6th Street, Brooklyn, NY 11211; Brooklyn, New York; United States
- Coordinates: 40°42′57″N 73°57′19″W

Information
- Type: Public
- Motto: Redefining Career & Technical Education in New York City
- Established: 2004
- School district: 14
- Oversight: New York City Department of Education
- School number: 558
- Principal: Gill Cornell
- Teaching staff: 31
- Grades: 9-12
- Enrollment: 600
- Campus: Harry Van Arsdale Campus
- Colors: Blue and Silver
- Nickname: WHSAD
- Website: whsad.org
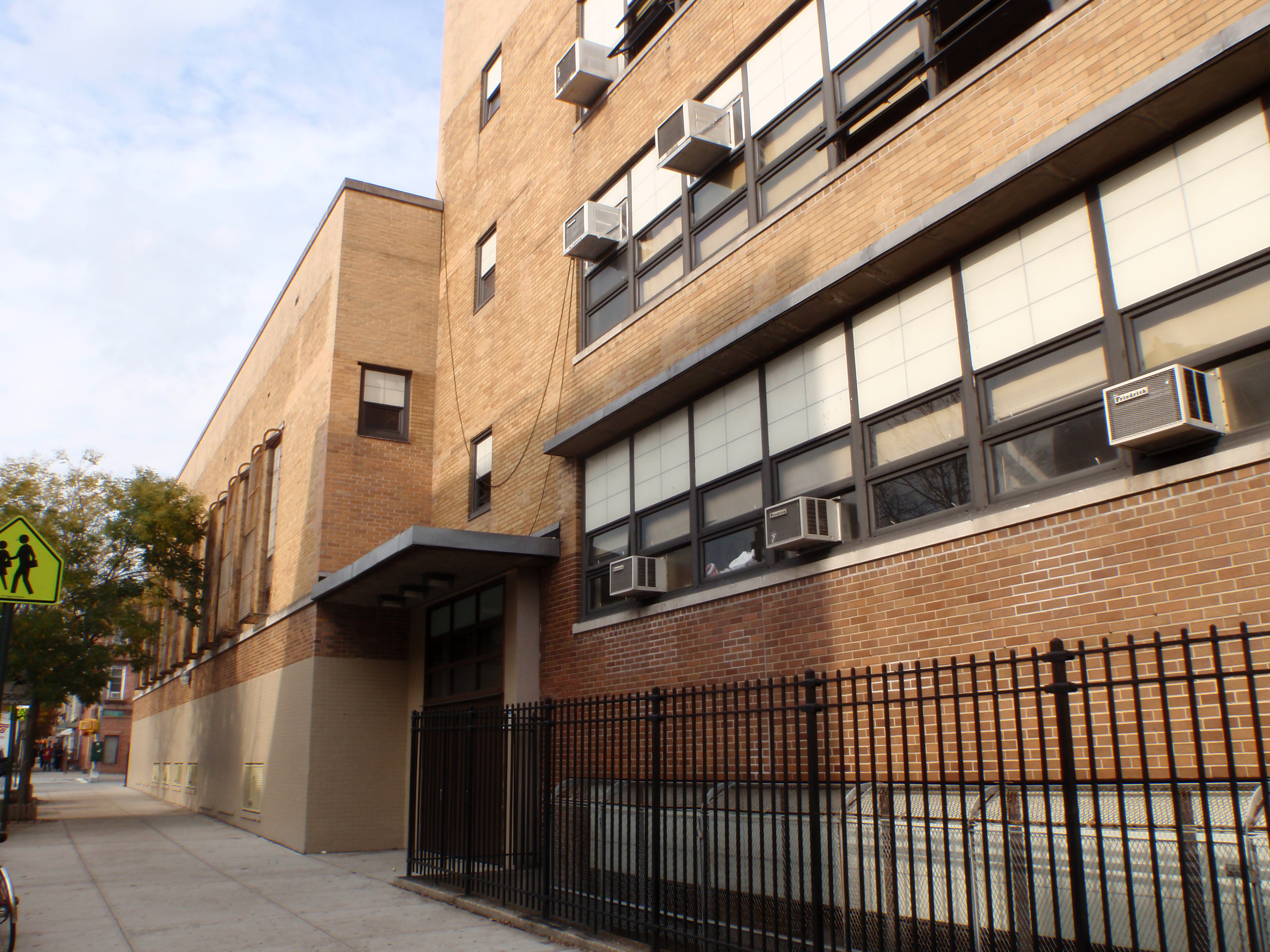

The Williamsburg High School for Architecture and Design, commonly called WHSAD, Architecture and Design or A&D, is a 9-12th grade New York City college-preparatory public high school that specializes in the integration of architecture, design, and historic preservation in its classes.
