= Rebecca School =

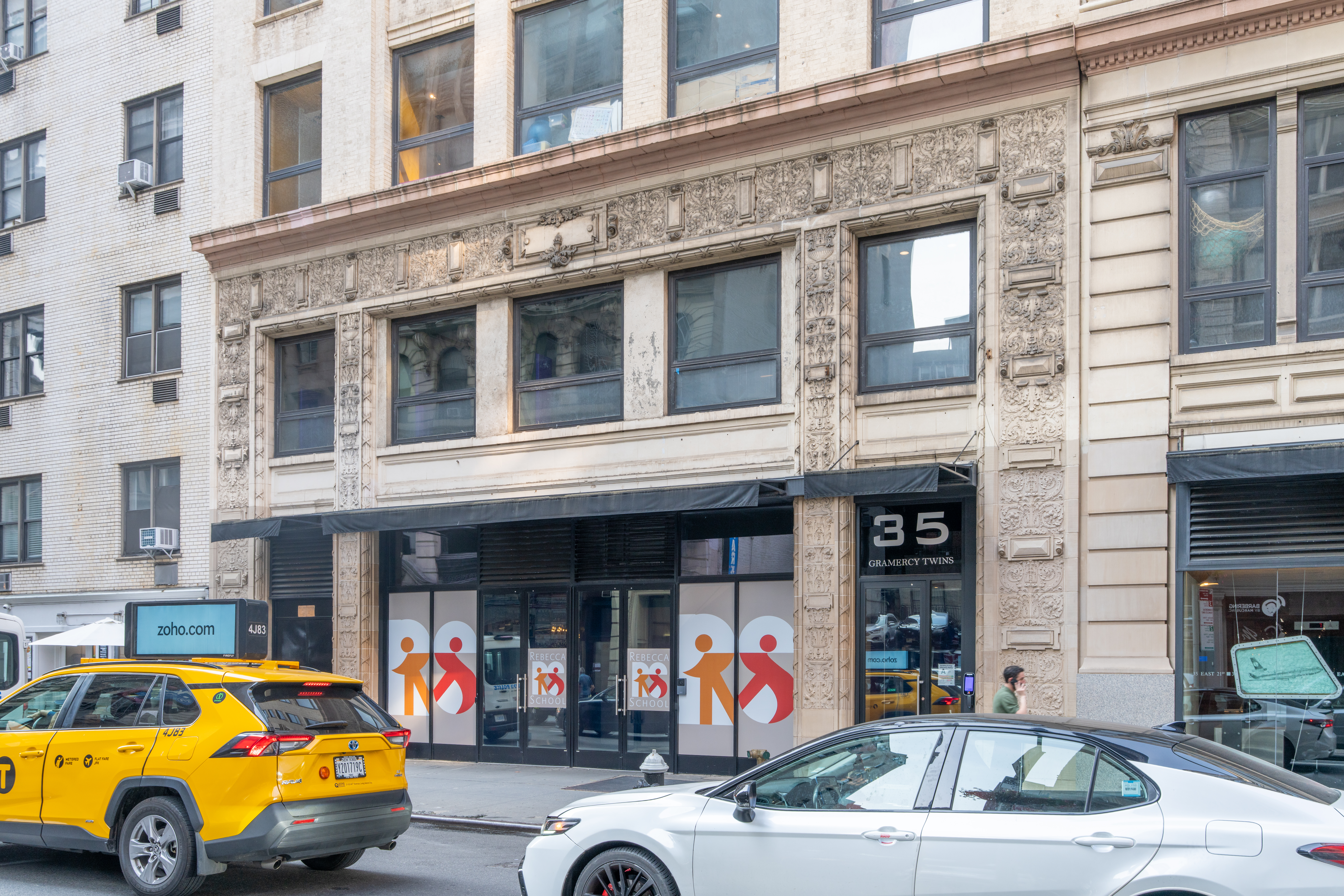
- School on 21st St (2025)

Location
- 40 East 30th Street, between Park Avenue & Madison Avenue; New York, New York; United States; 40.7448°N 73.9837°W

Information
- Type: Independent private school Special education
- Established: 2006
- Director: Tina McCourt
- Grades: Pre-K-12
- Website: www.rebeccaschool.org

Rebecca School is an independent private day school in New York City that specializes in teaching students ages four to 21 who have a range of neurodevelopmental disorders, including autism spectrum disorder. The school was founded in 2006 and uses a support method known as Floortime/DIR (Developmental, Individual-difference, Relationship-based) developed by Stanley Greenspan, M.D., a child psychiatrist and specialist in autism education who died in 2010. Greenspan's method was a change from the more traditional methods that sought to change behavior through operant conditioning. His method focuses on children's ability to build relationships. Rebecca School's space and facilities on East 30th Street were designed for the needs of autistic and disabled children, based on Greenspan's ideas. The school employs teachers who are trained to work with disabled students, as well as social workers who work with the families of the students.
