= Flushing International High School =

Public school in New York City

Location
- 144-80 Barclay Ave; Flushing, Queens, New York 11355; United States
- Coordinates: 40.759°N 73.8238°W

Information
- Type: Public
- Established: 2004; 22 years ago
- School district: New York City Department of Education
- NCES School ID: 360012205727
- Principal: Kevin Hesseltine
- Teaching staff: 26.33 (on an FTE basis)
- Grades: 9-12
- Enrollment: 407 (2022-2023)
- Student to teacher ratio: 15.46
- Campus: City: Large
- Colors: Cardinal and White
- Athletics conference: 2 PSAL teams + Intramural sports
- Mascot: Dragons
- Affiliation: The Internationals Network for Public Schools
- Website: www.fihsnyc.org

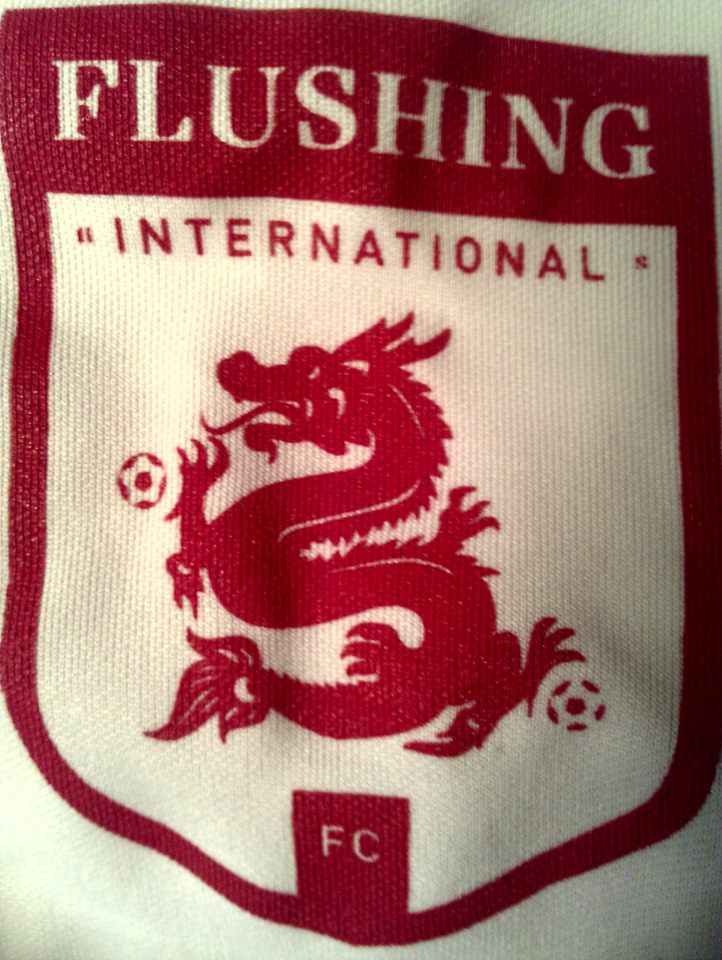
School Mascot

Flushing International High School is a New York City public high school that opened in September 2004 in Flushing, New York. Students come from over 30 countries and speak over twenty native languages. Flushing International is a NYC School Empowerment School in District 25.

== History ==
Flushing International High School is a member of The Internationals Network for Public Schools, a non-profit organization that grew out of the work of a group of international high schools in New York City. The organization now supports 12 schools in New York and California. The first international high school, located on the campus of LaGuardia Community College, opened in 1985; two more followed in the 1990s. Since 2001, the network has opened and supported 9 additional high schools with the help of the Bill and Melinda Gates Foundation. The network of schools annually serves 4,000 students immigrating from 90 countries. The network's mission is to provide quality education to recently arrived immigrants by developing and networking small high schools based on the Internationals approach.
