= Western Electric Company-Tarheel Army Missile Plant =

United States historic place

- U.S. National Register of Historic Places
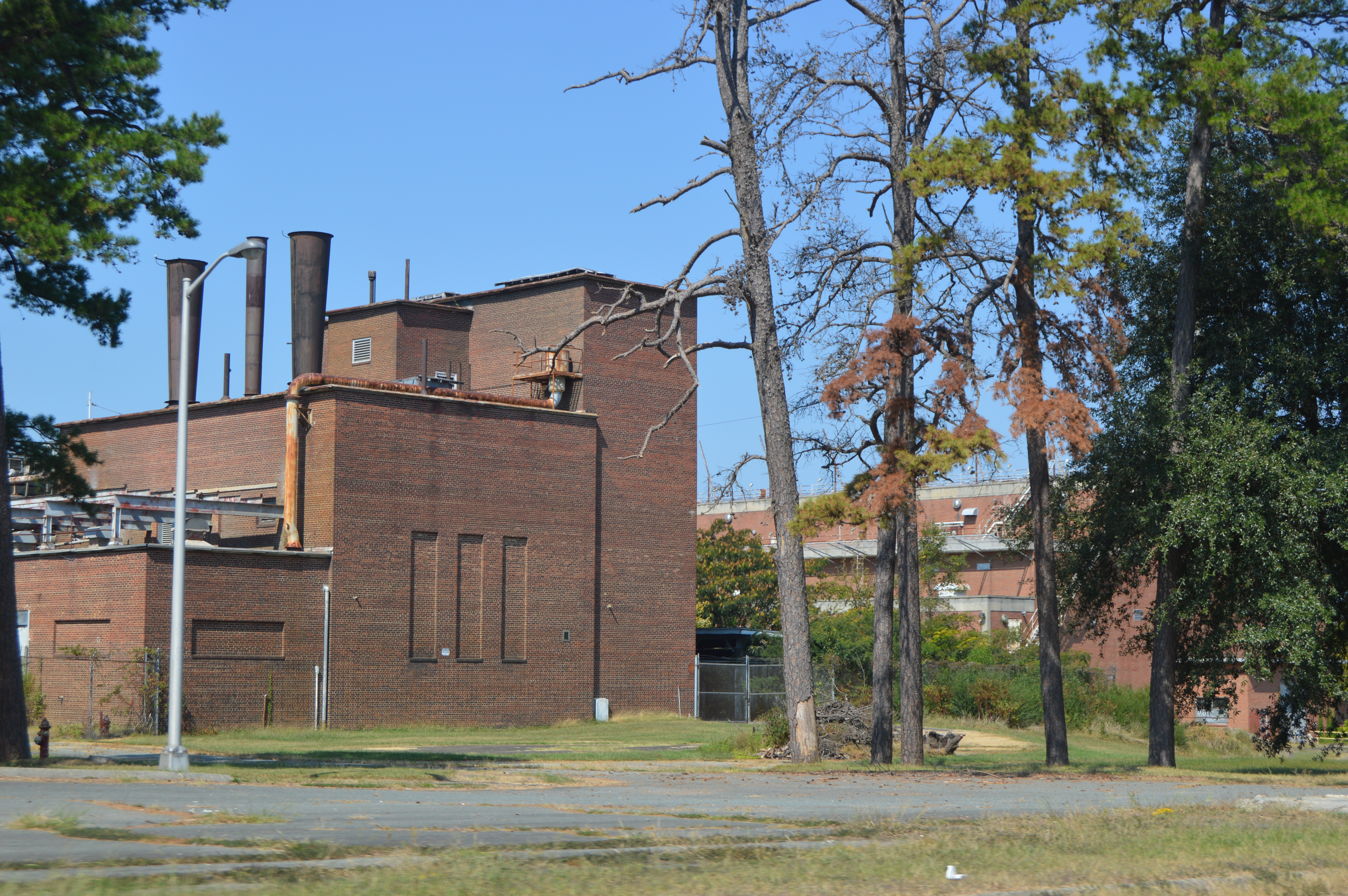
- Street view of the Western Electric Company-Tarheel Army Missile Plant, located at 204 Graham-Hopedale Road in Burlington, North Carolina (October 21, 2019)

- Location within North Carolina Location within the United States
- Location: 204 Graham-Hopedale Road, Burlington, North Carolina
- Coordinates: 36°05′51″N 79°24′22″W
- Built: 1927
- Architect: Albert Kahn Associates; Western Electric Company's Factory Planning and Plant Engineering Department; Six Associates, Inc.
- Architectural style: Industrial architecture
- NRHP reference No.: 16000219
- Added to NRHP: May 2, 2016

Western Electric Company-Tarheel Army Missile Plant is an abandoned industrial complex located approximately two miles east of downtown Burlington's commercial district in Alamance County, North Carolina. Built in 1927, it is listed on the National Register of Historic Places.

== History ==
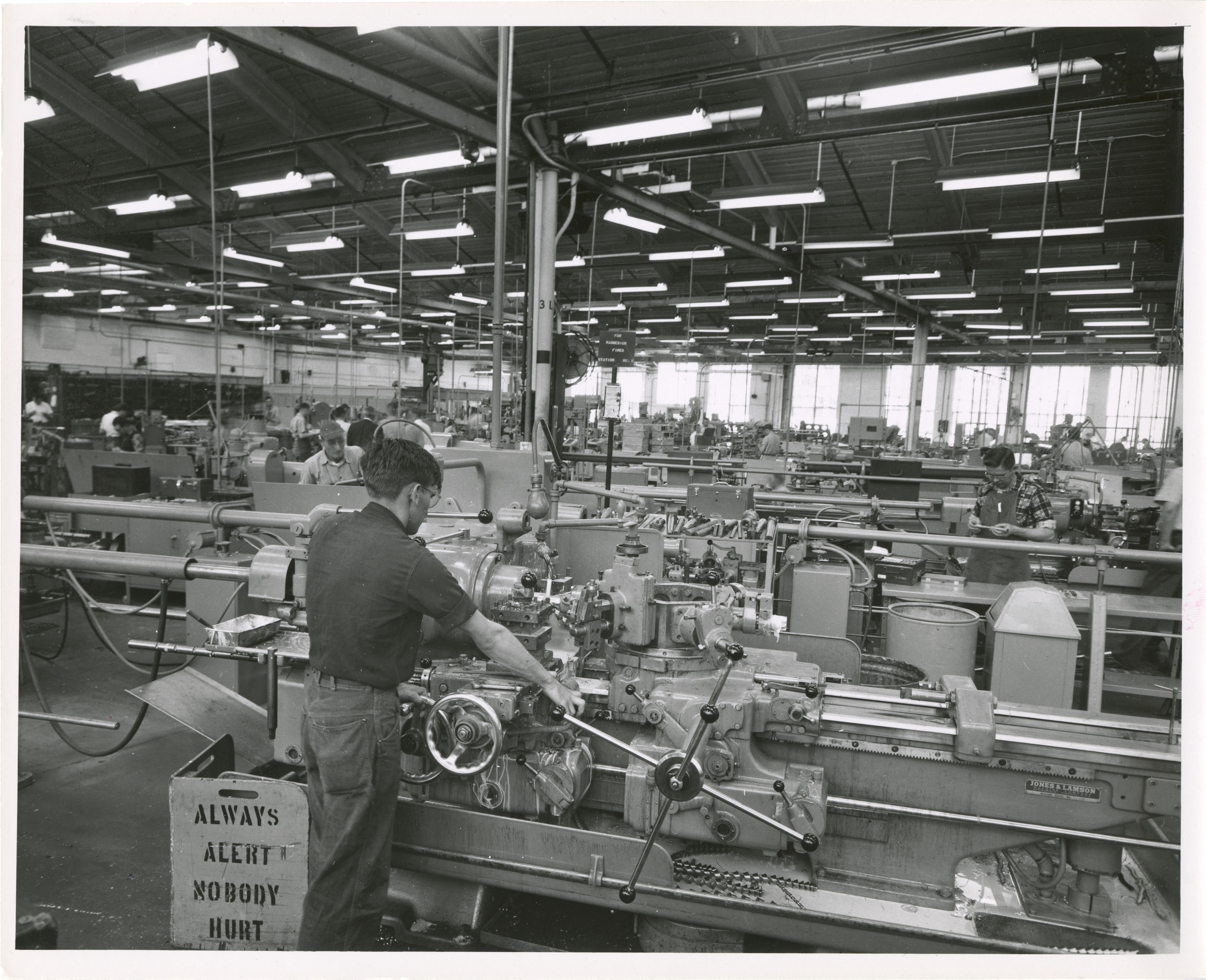
Manufacturing floor at the plant, 1953

The Tarheel Army Missile Plant was constructed in 1927 as a synthetic fabric rayon manufacturing plant for the A.M. Johnson Rayon Mills, Inc. The company failed in marketing their rayon product to the textile weaving plants in the Burlington vicinity. As a result, the plant was renamed the Carolina Rayon Mills, Inc and a new management was brought in. But, this reorganization failed to improve the company's financial situation, and eventually the plant was closed in November 1931.

From 1931 until 1942, the plant remained mostly vacant. It was used for various short-term purposes, including tobacco warehousing and automobile storage.

But, during World War II, Detroit-based architect Albert Kahn's firm designed Building 4 to accommodate Fairchild Engine & Airplane Corporation manufacturing line to support war effort.

After World War II, in 1958, the plant was leased to the Western Electric Company, for research, engineering, production, and refurbishment of missile systems and components. But, the plant was under the operational control of the US Army's MICOM, which used to be a major subcommand of DARCOM .

The whole complex is spread over a 32-acre site, and has 23 buildings that once provided approximately 700,000 square feet of usable manufacturing and assembly space. Currently, the complex houses Good Samaritan Super Thrift Store.

The site has become a “superfund” clean-up site since PFAS and other dangerous contaminants were found at and in the groundwater surrounding the site in east Burlington. Tests revealed PFOS, PFOA, PFBS, PFNA, and PFHxS in the analytical results. Local community advocates want the site’s cleanup to be done with neighbors’ best interests in mind.
