= John C. Nickerson Jr. =

United States Army colonel (1915–1964)

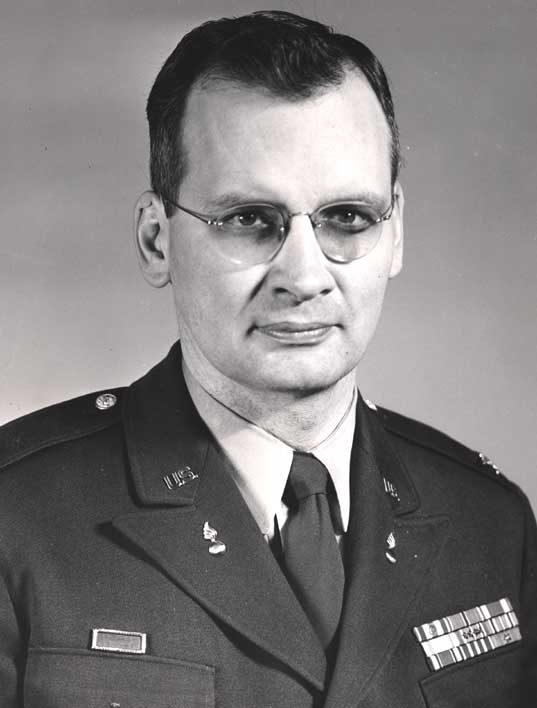
- Col. Nickerson ca. 1957
- Born: November 18, 1915; Paris, Kentucky
- Died: March 1, 1964 (aged 48); Alamogordo, New Mexico
- Alma mater: United States Military Academy; California Institute of Technology (master's degree)
- Spouse: Caroline Nickerson
- Military career
- Allegiance: United States
- Branch: United States Army
- Service years: 1938−1964
- Rank: Colonel
- Unit: Field Artillery Branch
- Commands: 56th Field Artillery Battalion
- Conflicts: World War II

John Charles Nickerson Jr. (November 18, 1915 – March 1, 1964) was a colonel in the United States Army and a Redstone Arsenal employee. He fought in World War II and then became involved in the Army Ballistic Missile Agency. Following an inter-service dispute over missile programs, in 1957 Nickerson became the first American to be charged under the Espionage Act for leaking classified national security information to the press. After pleading guilty to lesser charges, he briefly had his rank suspended. He spent the rest of his life in various other military roles before dying in a car accident. During World War II, he commanded the 56th Field Artillery Battalion in Europe and was awarded the Silver Star and the French Croix de Guerre.

== Early life ==
Nickerson was born in Paris, Kentucky on November 18, 1915. He attended grammar school and high school in Paris and, after graduating, spent one year at the University of Kentucky studying industrial chemistry before enrolling at West Point, graduating on June 13, 1938.

After graduating, Nickerson was commissioned into the Army's Artillery Branch. He held several command positions of increasing rank inside the United States before being given command of the 56th Field Artillery Battalion, a unit of the 8th Infantry Division Artillery, at Ft. Sill in July 1942. In December 1943 the division landed in Northern Ireland to prepare for combat operations under Operation Overlord. As a lieutenant colonel, Nickerson led the battalion into combat on July 6, 1944, and saw action in the Normandy, Northern France, Rhineland and Central Europe campaigns. He was awarded the Bronze Star and the French Croix de Guerre with Silver Gilt Star for his actions in combat supporting the division's advance from La Haye-du-Puits to the Northern bank of the Ay River during the Normandy campaign, and during the Battle for Brest at Gouesnou and along the Lambezellec-Pontanezen Ridge during the Northern France campaign. He received the Silver Star for his action under fire in the Battle of Hürtgen Forest during the Rhineland campaign, and one bronze oak leaf cluster in lieu of a second Silver Star for his actions under fire in the Central Europe campaign during the advance on the Ruhr pocket near the towns of Valbert, Oberbrügge and Milspe, Germany. While defending their positions near Cologne in early 1945, Nickerson observed German V-2 rocket launches; he later credited the experience for his interest in rocketry.

By 1955, Nickerson was based in Washington, D.C. as an ordnance officer. After helping Wernher von Braun prepare a presentation on satellites for the Army, he became involved with von Braun's rocket team, serving as the Army Ballistic Missile Agency's liaison to the Defense Department. At the ABMA, Nickerson began working on the PGM-19 Jupiter ballistic missile program.

== Information leak ==
In 1956, United States Secretary of Defense Charles Wilson announced a restructuring of the United States' missile programs: the Army would be reduced to managing short-range missiles, while the Air Force would take over the development of intermediate- and long-range ballistic missiles. Nickerson, concerned that the 200-mile range limit on the Army's missiles would force the end of the Jupiter program, traveled to D.C. in late November to speak out against Wilson's decision, to little success.

Angered, Nickerson prepared a twelve-page document against Wilson's plan entitled "Considerations on the Wilson Memorandum." The document accused Wilson of corporate corruption in his plan to shift longer range missiles to the Air Force - despite his office, Wilson was still employed by General Motors, whose parts were used by the Air Force's PGM-17 Thor missile. Nickerson also pointed fingers at Admiral Arthur W. Radford, a confidant of Wilson whom Nickerson believed was poisoning the Defense Department against the Army. Nickerson also argued that keeping the missile program within the Army was necessary for national security and for the Army's ability to limit casualties in combat, comparing early missile tests in which the Jupiter missile had successfully flown 3,000 miles and the Thor missile had flown 3 feet. Much of the information Nickerson included in the document, including the results of the missile tests, was classified data.

With "Considerations" completed, Nickerson sent the documents anonymously, through aides and civilian employees, to select journalists and industrialists. "Considerations" reached, among others, Drew Pearson, author of the "Washington Merry-Go-Round" column; Erik Bergaust, managing editor of Missiles & Rockets; and William F. Hunt and John A. Baumann, employees of Reynolds Metal Company and the Radio Corporation of America respectively who were both involved at Redstone Arsenal. Nickerson also personally delivered the document to three members of the Alabama congressional delegation.

Pearson, uncertain if the information in "Considerations" could be legally published, took his copy of the document to the Defense Department to check, where it was promptly seized and universally classified. Federal investigation determined the document to have been produced on a type of typewriter used exclusively by high-ranking Army officers. While the document was initially traced to the ribbon of von Braun's typewriter, questioning headed by Army inspector general David Ogden turned up information that Nickerson regularly borrowed the typewriter for his own use.

== Arrest and trial ==
On the morning of January 2, 1957, Nickerson himself was interrogated by Ogden about the leaked documents. Nickerson feigned ignorance and was directed to return for more questions that afternoon; instead, he returned home and began to burn the classified documents still in his possession. When he failed to appear for the scheduled second round of interrogation, military police traveled to his home and, finding two classified documents in his unlocked desk drawer, arrested him.

On January 28, Nickerson was charged by the Army with 15 Army security regulations, violation of the Espionage Act by leaking classified documents, and perjury by lying to the inspector general during interrogation. While charged, he was relieved of his duties at Redstone. Though Nickerson faced up to $10,000 in fines and 46 years in prison, he doubted the prosecution's seriousness in charging him with espionage, saying in personal correspondence, "I, therefore, do not expect more than a five hundred dollar fine."

Nickerson's trial began June 25, 1957. Prosecutors quickly dropped the Espionage Act and perjury charges, assessing the risk from requiring classified documents as evidence as greater than the need to convict Nickerson under the higher charges. Instead they settled for a plea deal from Nickerson on the 15 lesser charges, one which he had signed three days prior to the trial.

The remaining four days of Nickerson's hearing were dedicated to the defense's argument for leniency in Nickerson's sentencing. His defense team, led by civilian lawyer Ray Jenkins, argued that Nickerson's leaks were motivated by "loyalty to the Army and country" and were not intended to undermine national security, further alleging that the information included in "Considerations" was already public knowledge to foreign agents. The defense also called character witnesses, including von Braun and Ernst Stuhlinger, to speak on Nickerson's behalf; the prosecution, meanwhile, brought in Nickerson's commanding officer John Bruce Medaris, who framed Nickerson as impulsive and suggested he had no place returning to Army service.

At the end of the trial, following 43 minutes of jury deliberation, Nickerson received his sentence. He was charged a $100 fine per month for 15 months, suspended from his rank as colonel for one year, and formally reprimanded.

== Later life and death ==
After his rank was suspended, Nickerson was appointed to the Panama Canal Zone as a construction inspector. He worked there until his security clearance was restored, after which he was assigned to Fort Bliss, Texas, as an ordnance officer. Nickerson ultimately returned to working in the Army missile program.

On March 1, 1964, both Nickerson and his wife Caroline were killed in a head-on automobile collision on Route 54 near a missile center in Alamogordo, New Mexico.
