= Pershing Project Manager's Office =

The Pershing Project Manager's Office (PPMO) was the U.S. Army agency responsible for the systems management and engineering of the Pershing missile systems.

== History ==
Pershing management was initially under the Army Ballistic Missile Agency (ABMA) at Redstone Arsenal, Alabama in 1958. ABMA was initially a group under the Army Ordnance Missile Command (AOMC). On 11 December 1961, ABMA was abolished and the personnel and mission moved directly to AOMC. The United States Army Missile Command (MICOM) was activated at Redstone Arsenal on 23 May 1962; Pershing and other project offices were transferred. On 31 January 1977, MICOM was split into the United States Army Missile Materiel Readiness Command (MIRCOM) and the United States Army Missile Research and Development Command (MIRADCOM). On 1 July 1979, MIRCOM and MIRADCOM were disestablished and combined again into MICOM. On 1 May 1987, the Program Executive Office (PEO) for Fire Support was established at Redstone Arsenal and the PPMO was transferred. After the Intermediate-Range Nuclear Forces Treaty (INF) between the United States and the USSR became effective on 1 June 1988, the PPMO returned to MICOM in March 1989. Responsibility for Pershing project management was placed under the direction of the newly established MICOM Weapon Systems Management Directorate on 27 August 1989.

The PPMO operated the Pershing Modification and Repair Activity in Frankfurt, Germany, commonly known as the Mod Shop, which performed depot-level repairs and modified Pershing equipment as required. The shop was run by a warrant officer assigned to the PPMO with several enlisted soldiers and over fifty civilians employed by Martin Marietta Aerospace.

== Decorations ==
- Superior Unit Award (August 1989 – June 1991)

== Project managers ==
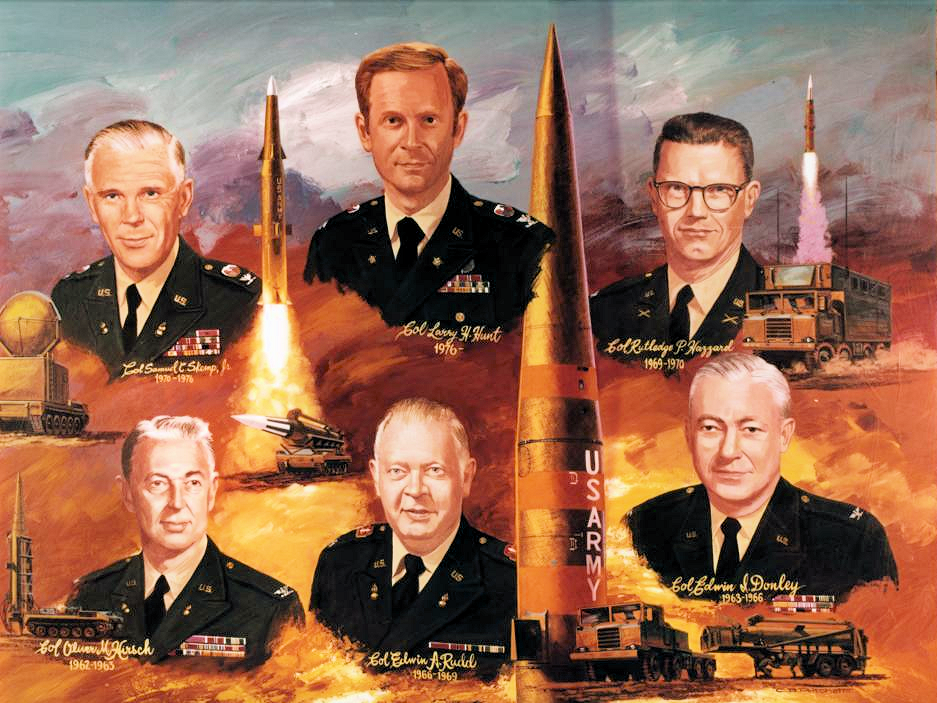
Col. Samuel C. Skemp, Jr., Col. Larry H. Hunt, Col. Rutledge P. Hazzard, Col. Oliver M. Hirsch, Col. Edwin A. Rudd, Col. Edwin L. Donley

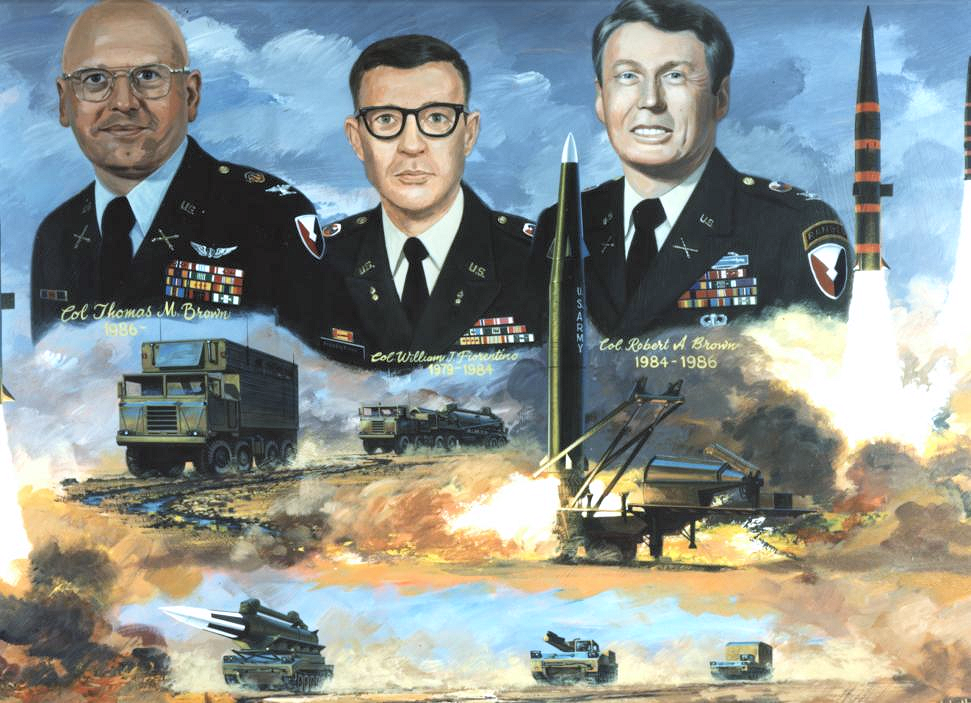
Col. Thomas M. Brown, Col. William J. Fiorentino, Col. Robert A. Brown

- Col. Oliver M. Hirsch (August 1962 – October 1963)
- Col. Edwin L. Donley (October 1963 – June 1966)
- Carl A. Pinyerd - acting (1966)
- Col. Edwin A. Rudd (June 1966 – June 1969)
- Col. Rutledge P. Hazzard (June 1969 – December 1970)
- Col. Samuel C. Skemp, Jr. (December 1970 – August 1976)
- Col. Larry H. Hunt (August 1976 – May 1979)
- Col. William J. Fiorentino (May 1979 – April 1984)
- Col. Robert A. Brown (April 1984 – March 1986)
- Col. Thomas M. Brown (March 1986 – March 1989)
