= Raymond C. Bowen =

American biologist and college president (1934–2021)

Raymond Bowen
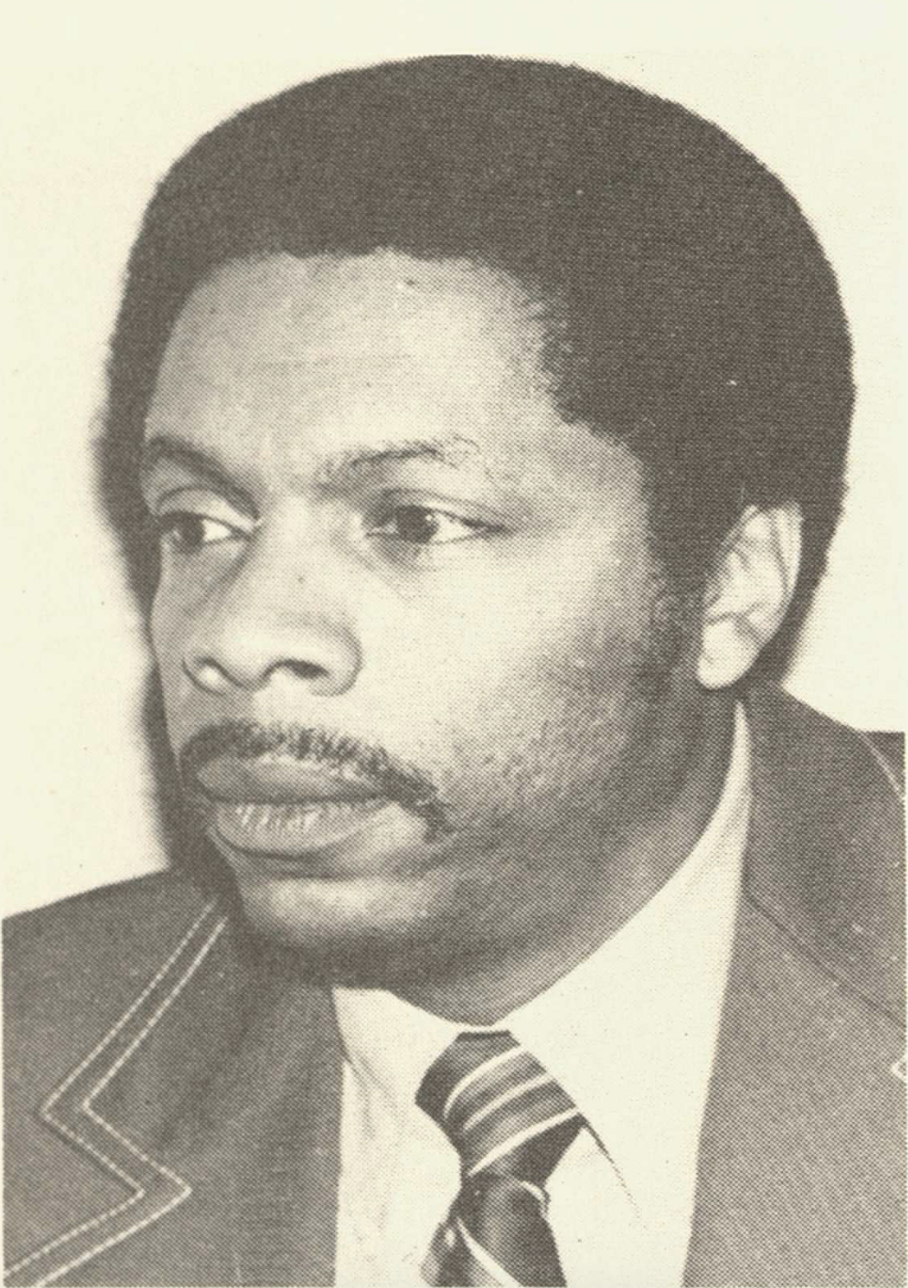
- Bowen circa 1976

President of Shelby State Community College
- In office 1982–1989

2nd President of LaGuardia Community College
- In office 1989–1999
- Preceded by: Joseph Shenker
- Succeeded by: Gail Mellow

Personal details
- Born: Raymond Cobb Bowen; September 19, 1934 New Haven, Connecticut
- Died: August 23, 2021 (aged 86) Baltimore, Maryland
- Education: University of Connecticut; University of New Mexico
- Occupation: Biologist, academic administrator

Raymond Cobb Bowen (September 19, 1934 – August 23, 2021) was an American biologist and academic administrator who served as president of Shelby State Community College in Memphis, Tennessee, and LaGuardia Community College in Queens, New York.

== Early life and education ==
Bowen was born on September 19, 1934, in New Haven, Connecticut, to Raymond Curtis Bowen and Lucille Cobb Bowen. Raised in public housing, he graduated from Hillhouse High School in 1952. Bowen earned a Bachelor of Arts degree in zoology from the University of Connecticut in 1956 and then served three years in the United States Army. He earned a Master of Science degree in biology from the University of New Mexico in 1962 and a Ph.D. in parasitology and biochemistry from the University of Connecticut in 1966.

== Academic career ==
After receiving his doctorate, Bowen worked as a postdoctoral researcher at Ohio Wesleyan University and the University of Illinois Urbana-Champaign in 1966–67. He became an assistant professor of biology at Cleveland State University, serving as assistant to the president and subsequently as dean of developmental programs from 1968 to 1971. Recruited as an associate professor of natural sciences at the newly founded LaGuardia Community College in 1971, he went on to serve as associate dean of faculty, dean of the satellite campus, and dean of academic affairs. In 1975, Bowen became vice president of the Harbor Campus at the Community College of Baltimore, where he rose to vice president of academic and student affairs.

In 1982, Bowen became president of Shelby State Community College in Memphis, Tennessee. During his tenure at this institution, he established an on-campus high school for students at risk of dropping out, and also established an entrepreneurship training center geared toward women and minorities.

Bowen returned to LaGuardia Community College in 1989, where he became the college's second president (succeeding Joseph Shenker) as well as professor of natural and applied sciences. He led diversity initiatives and launched international partnerships in China, Columbia, the Dominican Republic, South Africa, and the United Kingdom. He retired in 1999 and later served as a visiting professor at Morgan State University.

Bowen served on the boards of Phelps-Stokes Fund and the American Council on Education. Black Issues in Higher Education designated him as an Outstanding College Leader of the 20th Century, and the University of Connecticut honored him as a distinguished alumnus in 1976.

== Personal life ==
Bowen died in Baltimore, Maryland, on August 23, 2021, at the age of 86.
