= LaGuardia Community College =

Community college in Queens, New York

Coordinates: 40°44′37″N 73°56′4″W

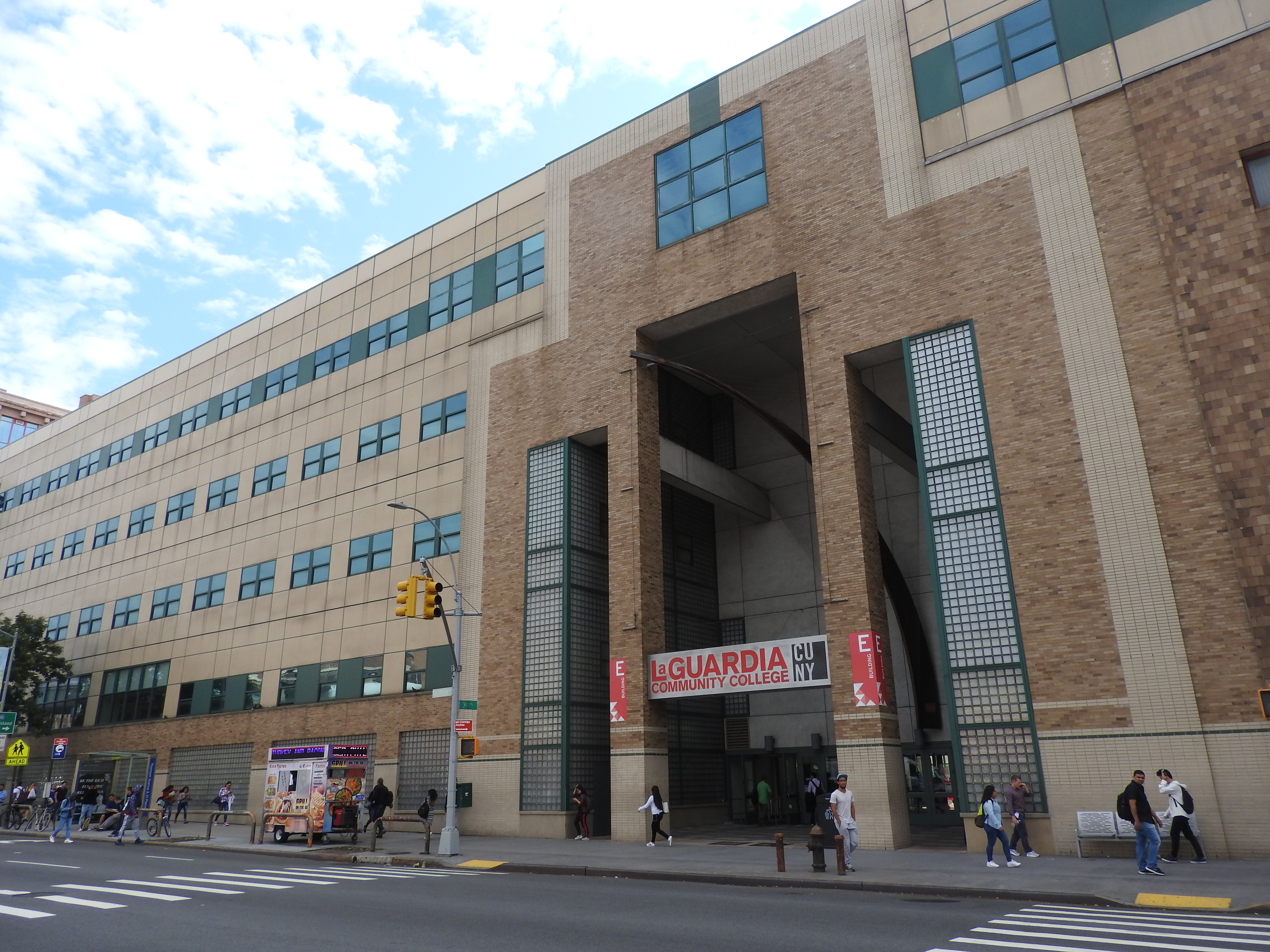
- Building E at the east end of the campus.
- Other names: LaGuardia, LAGCC
- Type: Public community college
- Established: 1968; 58 years ago
- President: Kenneth Adams
- Students: 25,877
- Undergraduates: 14,494
- Other students: Non-credit 11,383
- Location: Long Island City, New York, United States
- Campus: Urban
- Colors: LAGCC Red
- Mascot: Rebel the Red Hawk
- Website: www.laguardia.edu

LaGuardia Community College is a public community college in New York City. It is in the Long Island City neighborhood of Queens in and part of the City University of New York. LaGuardia is named after former congressman and New York City mayor Fiorello H. LaGuardia. The college offers associate degrees in the arts, sciences, and applied sciences, as well as continuing education programs.

== History ==
=== 20th century ===
LaGuardia Community College was founded on January 22, 1967, by a resolution of the Board of Higher Education of the City of New York, a New York State government agency which was the precursor to the City University of New York's board of trustees. The new college, originally designated "Community College Number Nine", was to be comprehensive: "The college will be oriented to the needs and interests of the community in which it is located, providing cultural activities, special services, continuing education and skills training opportunities for community residents of all ages."

The college's first president was Joseph Shenker, who had been Acting President of Kingsborough Community College and at age 29, the youngest community college president anywhere in the United States. In October 1970, the Board of Higher Education, breaking with CUNY's geographic naming convention, named the new college after Mayor LaGuardia, noting his "lifelong public service to the people of the City of New York and of the United States, and his ambitious and successful leadership of good government campaigns to provide decent living conditions and guarantee democratic processes for all...."

The college was officially opened on September 22, 1971, and received its first accreditation from the Middle States Association in December 1972 when the college graduated its first class. Shenker was succeeded as president by Raymond C. Bowen in 1989 and by Gail Mellow in 2000.

The La Guardia and Wagner Archives was established on campus in 1982.

=== 21st century ===
In Fall of 2020, the college's fourth president was appointed by the CUNY Board of Trustees, Kenneth Adams.

In early 2024, the Steven & Alexandra Cohen Foundation donated $116 million for the establishment of a workforce development center at LaGuardia Community College, which is planned to open in 2029.

== Campus ==
On March 24, 1970, the New York City Board of Higher Education approved the former Ford Instrument Company building on Long Island City's Thomson Avenue as the location for the College. At this time, Joseph Shenker was named president of the proposed college. Renovations to the five-story, former factory began the same year. This building would serve as the Main building of the new college—renamed Shenker Hall in 2008 in honor of the College's founding president.

The Ford Instrument Building was intended to be a temporary home for the college. On September 22, 1972, the school received from the U.S. Department of Health, Education and Welfare, for payment of $1, a 5.2-acre (21,000 m^{2}) site in Astoria that had formerly been the U.S. Army Pictorial Center, with the intention of moving the college to a campus on the new site. Originally the Famous Players–Lasky film studio, the complex consisted of 15 buildings. However, in 1974 during the city's fiscal crisis the site had to be sold off, as the expense of maintaining it in the interim was too high. The Army Pictorial Center would later become Kaufman Astoria Studios.

The current campus including Shenker Hall is located at the east end of Long Island City near Sunnyside. The area is physically separated from the rest of Long Island City by the Long Island Rail Road's Sunnyside Yard. The campus runs between Thomson Avenue to the north and 47th Avenue to the south, extending east from 28th Street near the Queensboro Bridge approach to Van Dam Street. The buildings of the campus consist of former Long Island City factories and warehouses converted for school use.

=== Public transit access ===
The closest New York City Subway station to the campus is the 33rd Street–Rawson Street station served by the 7 train. The primary bus route serving the campus is the Q39.

=== Current buildings ===
==== C Building ====
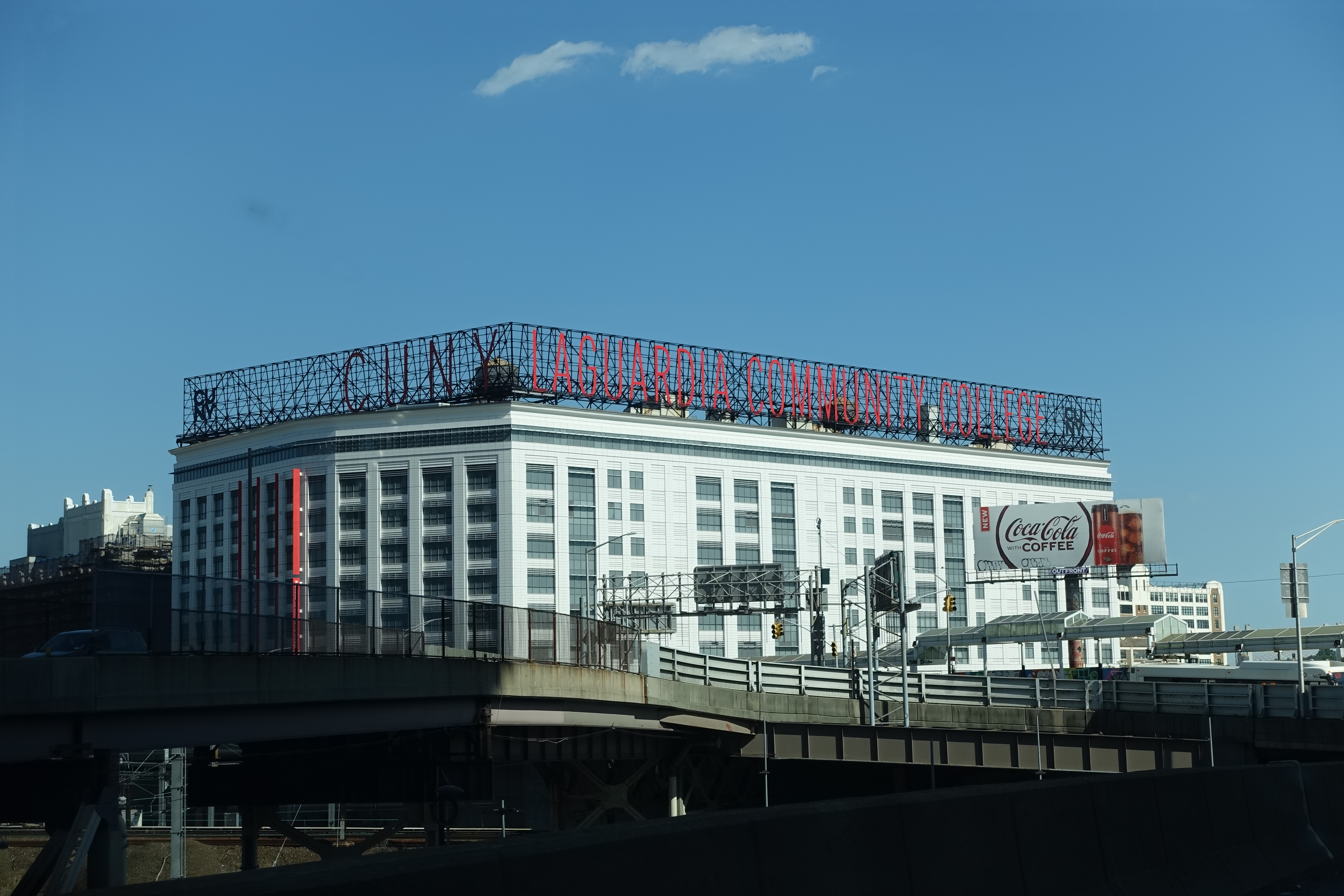
Building C at the west end of the campus in 2022.

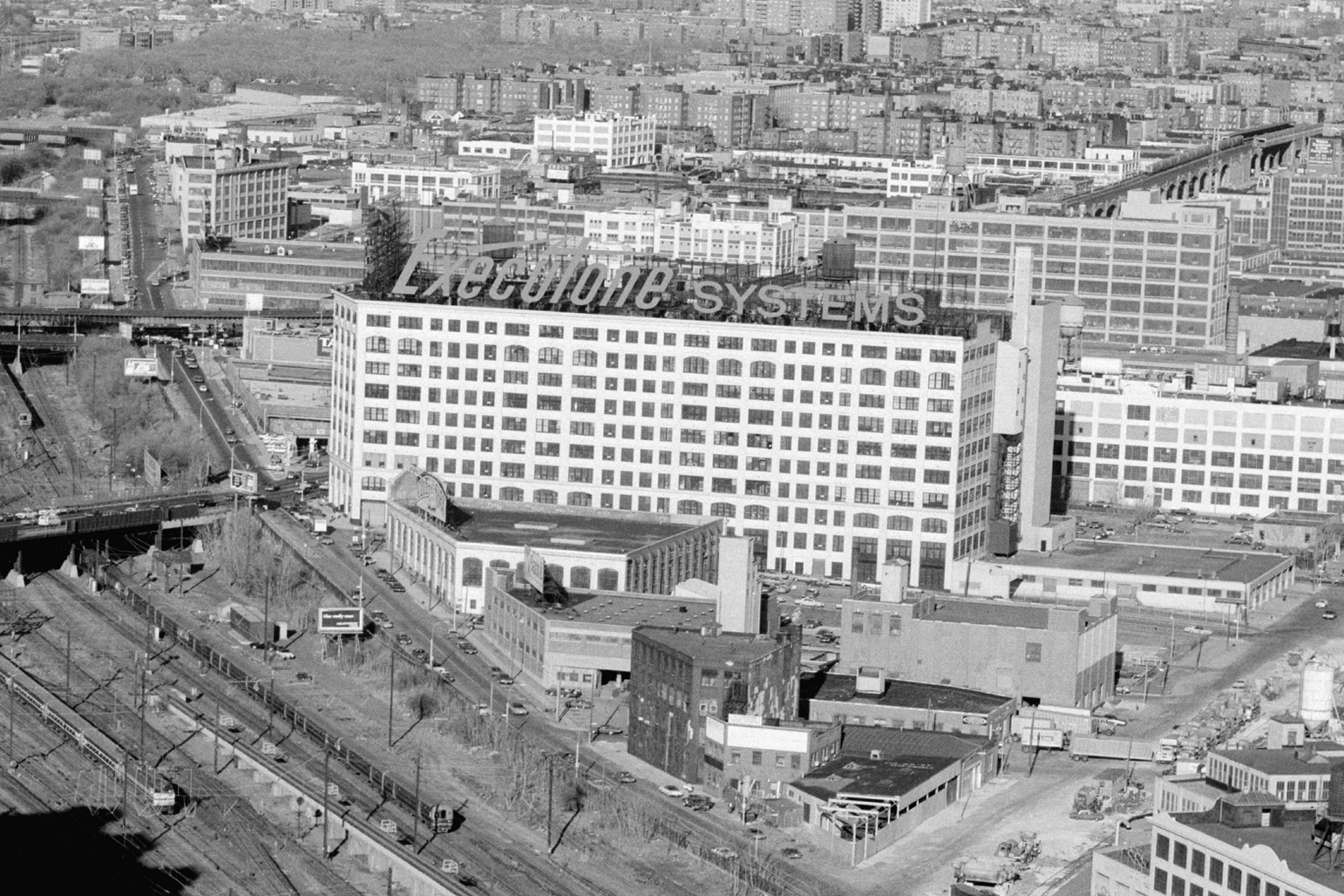
The building in 1977, then used by Executone.

At the far west end of the campus is the C Building or Center III, located between 29th and 30th Street near the Queensboro Bridge approach. The ten-story former factory was constructed in 1912 as the Loose-Wiles Sunshine Biscuits Building. Due to its size and numerous windows, the building was dubbed the "largest factory in Long Island", "world's largest bakery", and the "Thousand Window Bakery". The building was designed by architect William Higginson, with a reinforced concrete frame, and a glazed white terra cotta facade produced by the Atlantic Terra Cotta Company. A spur track from the nearby Long Island Rail Road fed into the rear of the building, allowing freight cars to load and unload inside the facility. The complex also included a two-level garage building for the storage of delivery trucks. The biscuit factory was erected as part of the Degnon Terminal area of Long Island City, created by developer Michael Degnon. Degnon's firm was the contractor that excavated the Steinway Subway Tunnel to Midtown Manhattan. He also proposed and partially developed a major industrial port revolving around Flushing Bay, which later became Flushing Meadows–Corona Park.

By the 1970s, the building was used as the headquarters for Executone, a producer of telephone systems. It also served as a Gimbels warehouse. In 1975, LaGuardia Community College began leasing 20,000 square feet (1,900 m^{2}) of space on the third floor the Executone Building, including seven classrooms and a lecture hall. In 1981, the college leased an additional 40,000 square feet (3,700 m^{2}) of space on the building's seventh floor. In 1985, the Executone Building became part of a four-building complex known as the International Design Center New York (IDCNY). The complex included the adjacent Bucilla Building (Center II) and the former American Chicle Company factory (Center I). The name "Center III" originated from its use within the Design Center. Due to the 1987 stock market crash, Center III was never redesigned for IDCNY like the other two buildings. The entire Center III building was purchased by LaGuardia in 1998 for $52 million to create a West Campus. The college also purchased the adjacent garage (Center IV), the former Loose-Wiles truck garage. The purchase increased the size of the college campus by 70 percent, and would relieve space in the E Building.

In 2006 the college announced a series of projects to renovate the C Building. One of the projects completed circa 2010 renovated the interior of the building, creating new classrooms and office space. This involved removing a grain elevator used during the Sunshine Biscuit era. Other work involved constructing escalators in the building, overhauling passenger elevators, and converting three freight elevators into passenger elevators. In 2013, LaGuardia announced a project to install a new facade on the C Building, designed by Mitchell Giurgola Architects. An aluminum and terra cotta curtainwall would be installed atop the original terra cotta which was in disrepair, and new windows would also be installed. Both renovations improved the insulation and energy efficiency of the building. In addition, the two front entrances along Thomson Avenue were consolidated into a single main entrance. The project was completed in 2018.

The building features a large rooftop billboard sign which is illuminated at night. Over the years it has featured the names of its various tenants, including Loose-Wiles, Executone, and IDCNY. As part of the modern renovations to the C Building, the sign was fitted with branding for LaGuardia Community College.

==== B Building ====
The B Building or Center II is located between 30th Street and 30th Place, across from the C Building. The eight-story building was constructed in 1914 as the American Eveready Building within the Degnon Terminal, designed by Maynicke and Francke. The building occupies the northern half of the block between Thomson and 47th Avenues; the southern half was purchased by Eveready for a future expansion which was never built, and it is currently used as a parking lot. In 1929, the American Knit Goods company leased space in the building, beginning its use as a clothing and textile factory. By the 1940s, the plant was used by the Bernhard Ulmann Company and its subsidiary Bucilla Yarn.

The Bucilla Building became Center II of the International Design Center New York in 1985. As part of renovations for the design center created by I. M. Pei & Partners, the open-air courtyards at the center of the building and the adjacent American Chicle Building (Center I) were covered with skylights to create atriums, while indoor walls were taken down to create more open interiors. By 1998, the International Design Center was renamed the Queens Atrium Corporate Center, and three floors from Center II were leased to DeVry University.

In 2006, LaGuardia Community College received $55 million allocated by the New York State Legislature for the purchase of new school buildings. This was used to lease two floors in the Bucilla Building beginning in 2008. In November 2009, the college opened a Healthcare Career Center inside the B Building.

Four of the eight floors of the building are occupied by the Queens High School Complex of the New York City Department of Education. The complex houses three public high schools: Bard High School Early College Queens, the Academy of Finance and Enterprise, and the High School of Applied Communication.

==== Joseph Shenker Hall and E Building ====
Located at the east end of the campus are the adjacent Joseph Shenker Hall, a.k.a. the Main Building or M Building; and the E Building or East Building, formerly the Annex Building. The two buildings occupy a two-block-wide site between 31st Street and Van Dam Street, with a common courtyard in between the two buildings along the de-mapped 31st Place.

The M Building was constructed in 1920 as the White Motor Company truck factory and service station, part of the Degnon Terminal. It replaced the company's plant at Broadway and 57th Street in Midtown Manhattan. In 1941, the building was sold to the Ford Instrument Company, a subsidiary of Sperry Rand. The factory manufactured electronics for the United States Armed Forces' World War II efforts. Following the war, the factory produced missile guidance systems for the Army Ballistic Missile Agency, designed the controls and instrumentation for the USS Seawolf nuclear submarine, and created other computer systems such as aircraft navigation systems for the U.S. military.

The Ford Instrument building was purchased by CUNY for the college, then provisionally known as "Community College IX", in 1970. "Phase I" renovations were conducted in the building prior to the opening of the college in September 1971. At this time, the building included basic classrooms and offices, a 115-seat library, and a "Great Hall" at the south end of the building for assemblies inherited from Sperry Rand. Additional "Phase II" renovations were completed in 1976, which added new classrooms and a theater, an atrium or mall referred to as an "interior street", and converted the Great Hall into a gymnasium.

The E building was originally operated as the Equitable Paper Bag factory building. In 1954, the company claimed to manufacture the largest paper bag in the world, measuring 14 feet (4.3 m) long. The building was purchased by LaGuardia in 1984, with the college proposing a major project to renovate the building and connect it to the Main Building. The plans were drawn up by Danforth Toan of the Warner, Burns, Toan and Lund firm. Ground was broken for the project on November 16, 1989, and the new building complex was dedicated and opened on June 4, 1992. The project included the LaGuardia Performing Arts Center at the south end of the E Building, featuring an 800-seat proscenium theater, and a new campus library at the north end. The basement of the complex contains the athletic facilities of the college. This includes a six-lane NCAA regulation swimming pool constructed in the 1992 project, a fitness center, and a gymnasium for multiple sports including basketball.

On August 14, 2008, the college dedicated the M Building as "Joseph Shenker Hall" in honor of founding president Joseph Shenker. Shenker would pass away in September of that year.

==== Middle College High School Campus ====
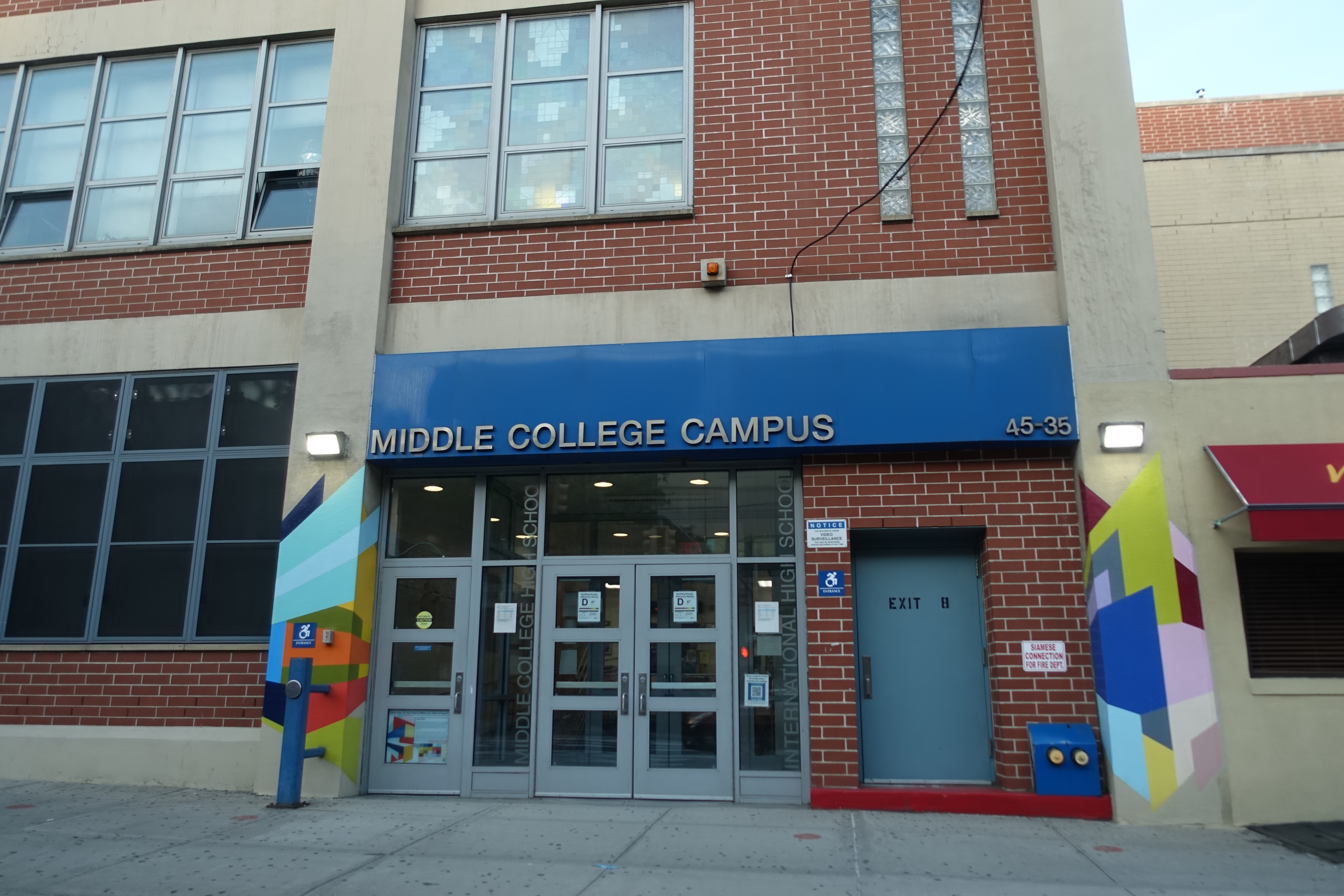
The former L Building, now Middle College Campus.

At the far east end of the campus across from the M and E Buildings is the Middle College High School Campus, formerly the college's L Building, located at Van Dam Street and 47th Avenue. The building houses two public high schools affiliated with the college, Middle College High School and International High School. Prior to educational use, the building served as the factory for X-Acto hobby knives, and as a depot for Pan American World Airways.

The building was purchased by the college in 1989. At this time, Middle College High School was moved into the building, with classrooms used by the high school during the day and by the college at night. In addition, an Early Child Care Learning Center for the children of college students was created in the building. On October 20, 1989, the building was dedicated as the Marie LaGuardia Building or L Building in honor of the wife of Fiorello La Guardia, who in 1982 donated records and memorabilia that formed the basis of the La Guardia and Wagner Archives.

An 820-seat addition or annex was completed in October 2012, designed by Goshow Architects. This allowed International High School to move from the M Building into the Middle College Campus.

=== Former buildings ===
==== S Building ====
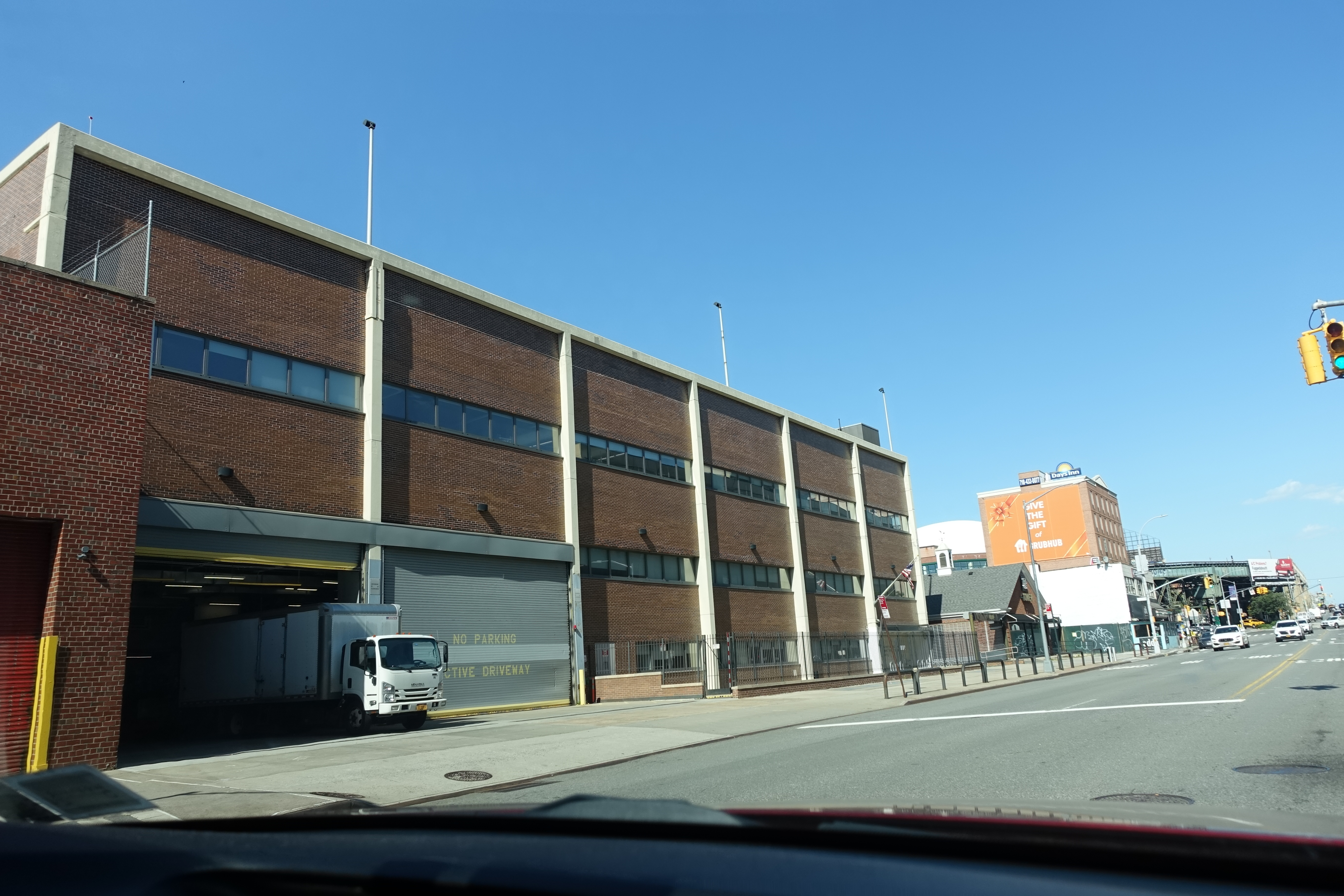
The former S Building, now the NYPL Library Services Center.

The former S Building, a.k.a. the Satellite Building or Satellite College (31-11 Thomson Avenue), is located on Thomson Avenue across to the north of the Main Building. It was originally known as the Sony Building. It was also the headquarters and warehouse for Stroheim & Romann, a fabric and interior design company.

LaGuardia began renting space in the building in 1973, occupying 71,000 square feet (6,600 m^{2}) of space. It was the original home of Middle College High School when it opened in 1974. In 1984, the college began leasing the second and third floors of the building, in addition to the basement and first floor already in use. The building features a rooftop parking lot, which was used by the college. The college ceased use of the building in the 1990s, after the completion of the E & M Building complex and the acquisition of the L Building.

In 2008, the New York Public Library began leasing the building. The library renovated the building for use as its Library Services Center, opening in 2010 at the cost of $50 million. The center contains a 238-foot (73 m) automated book sorting machine in the building's basement, and a digital imaging center.

== Academics ==
The College offers associate degrees and certificates in over 60 majors in Business and Technology, Liberal Arts, Health, Math, and Science. Non-traditional students were a key part of the college's initial focus, with programs for working mothers, Deaf students, the homeless, incarcerated individuals, and more. LaGuardia Community College is accredited by the Middle States Commission on Higher Education (MSCHE).

== Enrollment ==
As of the Fall of 2025, LaGuardia had an enrollment of 25,877 students. This includes 14,494 degree seeking students and 11,383 non-degree/continuing education students.

== Student body ==
LaGuardia's student body is made up of people from 131 different countries who speak 31 languages natively.

== Athletics ==
LaGuardia Community College teams participate as a member of the National Junior College Athletic Association (NJCAA). The Red Hawks are a member of the community college section of the City University of New York Athletic Conference (CUNYAC) since the 2013–14 season (the inaugural year of the school's athletic program). Sports include men's and women's basketball. Men's & women's soccer and men's & women's swimming & diving will also be added within its athletic program, effectively on the 2014–15 season.

== Notable people ==
=== Alumni ===
- Elly Gross, Holocaust survivor, poet and author
- Heather Foster, Jamaican American professional bodybuilder
- Ruben Diaz Jr., Bronx Borough President
- Reby Sky, professional wrestler
- Rudy Washington, Deputy Mayor under Rudolph Giuliani
- Jeffrey Archer, disk jockey

=== Faculty ===
- Bruce Davidson (former), photojournalist
- John A. Williams (former), novelist
- Barbara Zucker (former), sculptor
