= DJ JP =

American DJ

Jeffrey Archer, known professionally as DJ JP, is a New York-based disc jockey. He was the official DJ to New York rapper Pop Smoke, and has worked with artists including Cardi B, Future, Migos, Boogie Bryson Tiller, and Mavado. In 2020, DJ JP led Adidas’ annual 300 sneakers giveaway.

== Education and career ==
Born and raised in Brooklyn, New York, DJ JP studied Stage Management at La Guardia Community College, where he was a star athletes.

His DJ career started at an early age when he played at family and friends' events. In 2013, he began playing professionally. He secured deals with some New York colleges to play at their shows when artists such as Jay-Z, Future, Migos, and A Boogie did their college performance.

DJ JP was one of the DJs who played in the 2020 Thanksgiving 97 hours mix.
