= Gail Mellow =

American psychologist and college president

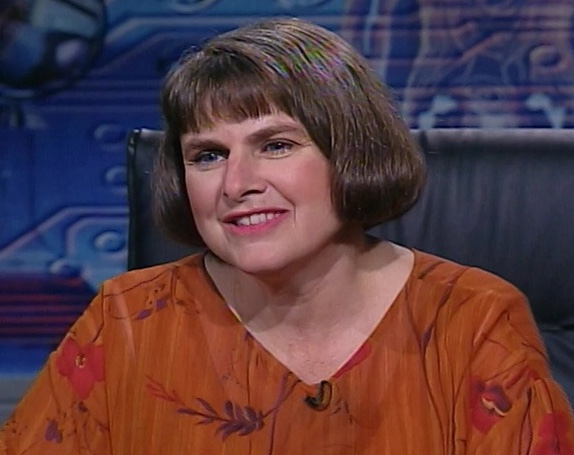
Mellow on CUNY TV's Education Forum, 2000.

Gail O'Connor Mellow was President from 2000 to 2019 of LaGuardia Community College located in Long Island City, New York.

== Life and career ==
Mellow was born in 1952. She received an A.A. from Jamestown Community College. She received her B.A. from SUNY Albany and graduated Phi Beta Kappa. She received her M.A. and Ph.D. in Social Psychology from George Washington University in Washington, D.C.

Mellow has had several leadership positions in different educational institutions. Immediately previous to her presidency of LaGuardia Community College, she was president of Gloucester County College, a position from which she resigned to take the presidency of LaGuardia, succeeding Raymond C. Bowen. Mellow has also served on numerous boards that include the Homeland Security Academic Advisory Council, American Association for Higher Education, the National Commission for Cooperative Education, and the Community College Research Center at Columbia University.

She is the co-author of Minding the Dream: The Process and Practice of the American Community College. She is also the author of numerous articles on the subjects of community colleges, economic development, and diverse faculty development.

Mellow founded and chaired the (NECEA) Northeast Connecticut Economic Alliance, a nonprofit development agency. She was also a member of the Human Resource Development Board of the Connecticut Employment and Training Commission. She represented the United States in the first US-China Community College collaborative conference meeting, which was held in Beijing in 2004. She was a consulting editor for Change magazine, a national magazine for higher education.Starting in 2020 she served as the Executive Director of the New York Jobs CEO Council.
