= Joseph Shenker =

American academic administrator (1939–2008)

Joseph Shenker (October 7, 1939 – September 20, 2008) was the first president of LaGuardia Community College and the fifth president of the Bank Street College of Education (1988–1995). From 1995 to 2008, he was provost of the C. W. Post campus of Long Island University.

== Early life ==
Shenker was born in Manhattan, the only child of George and Isabel Schwartz Shenker. George was a Russian immigrant who owned a shoulder-pad factory, and Isabel was a bookkeeper.

Shenker attended Hunter College, receiving his bachelor's degree in psychology in 1962 and his master's degree in economics in 1963. He received his doctorate in higher education administration from Teachers College, Columbia University in 1969.

== Career ==
Shenker was appointed as interim president of Kingsborough Community College in Brooklyn in 1969. In 1974, he founded the first charter school in the United States – the LaGuardia Middle College High School, as well as the International High School in Queens, New York.

He was a member of the board of directors of The Wallace Foundation since 2001.

== Personal life ==
Shenker died from complications of pulmonary fibrosis. He was married twice: first to Adrienne Greene, and later to Susan Smyth Shenker. He had four children and three grandchildren.
