= International High School (Queens) =

Public school in New York City

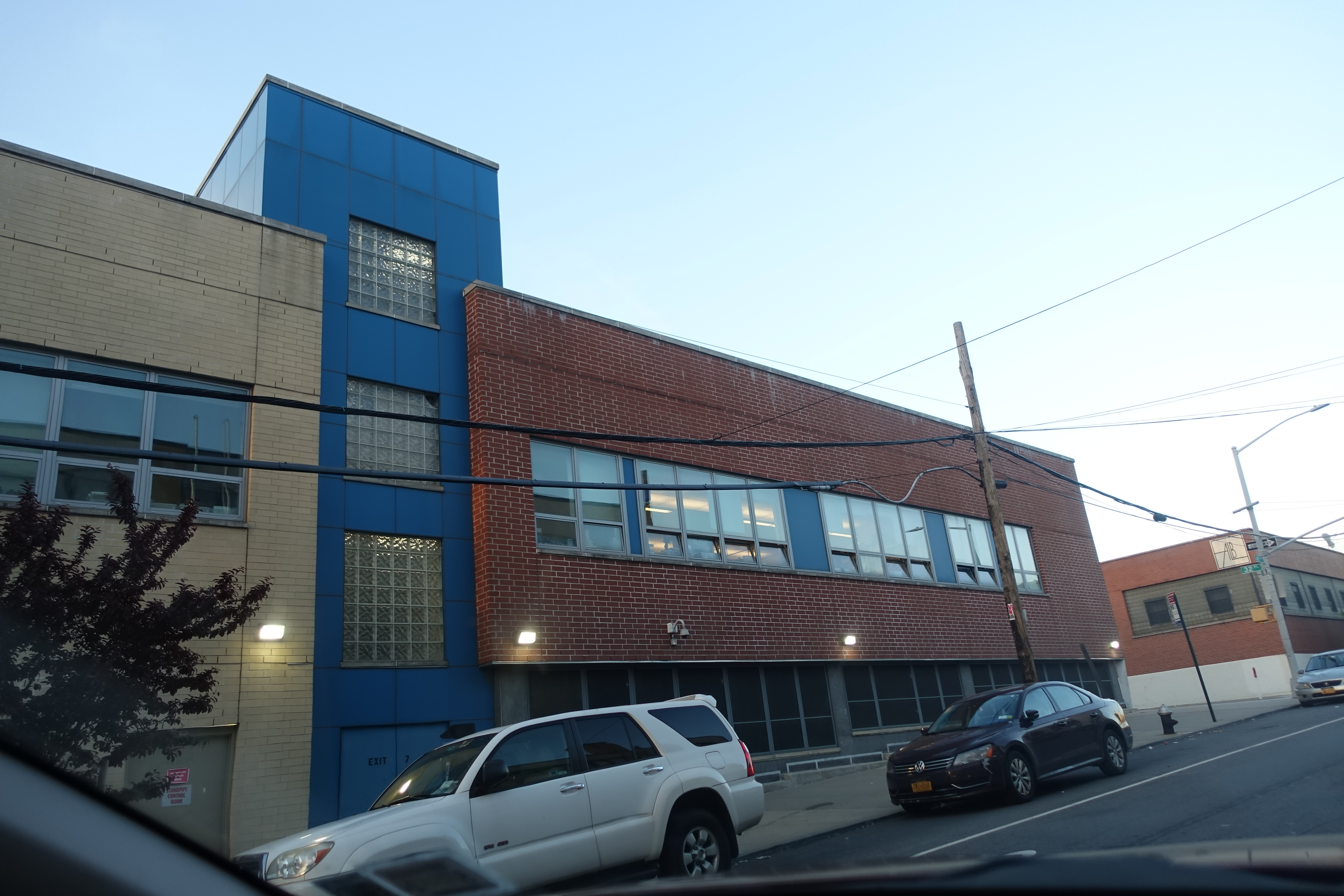
- International High School in 2022, housed in the Middle College Campus

Location
- 45-35 Van Dam Street; Long Island City, Queens, NY 11101; United States
- Coordinates: 40°44′41″N 73°56′06″W

Information
- Established: 1985
- Status: Open
- School board: New York City Department of Education
- School district: 24
- School number: Q530
- Grades: 9–12
- Accreditation: University of the State of New York

The International High School is a high school in Queens, New York City

== History ==
Former Principal Eric Nadelstern founded the International High School at LaGuardia Community College in 1985 as a joint venture by the New York City Board of Education and the Board of Higher Education of the City of New York. The school has been designated as an Academic Excellence Project and has twice been cited as a Center of Excellence for the teaching of English communication arts. Nadelstern left the school to join the New York State Education Department. Later, Nadelstern is the department's chief school officer and reports directly to the Chancellor. All twelve high schools belong to The Internationals Network for Public Schools.

== Curriculum ==
Classes are structured around the development of thematic projects in groups. Students work both collaboratively and independently.

There are six interdisciplinary programs, including:

- American Dream: Bridges to Reality
- Connections
- Inquiry and Action
- Origins, Growth, and Structures
- Projects and Adventures in New York City
- The World Around Us/World of Money
