= Middle College High School at LaGuardia Community College =

Public school in New York City

Middle College High School
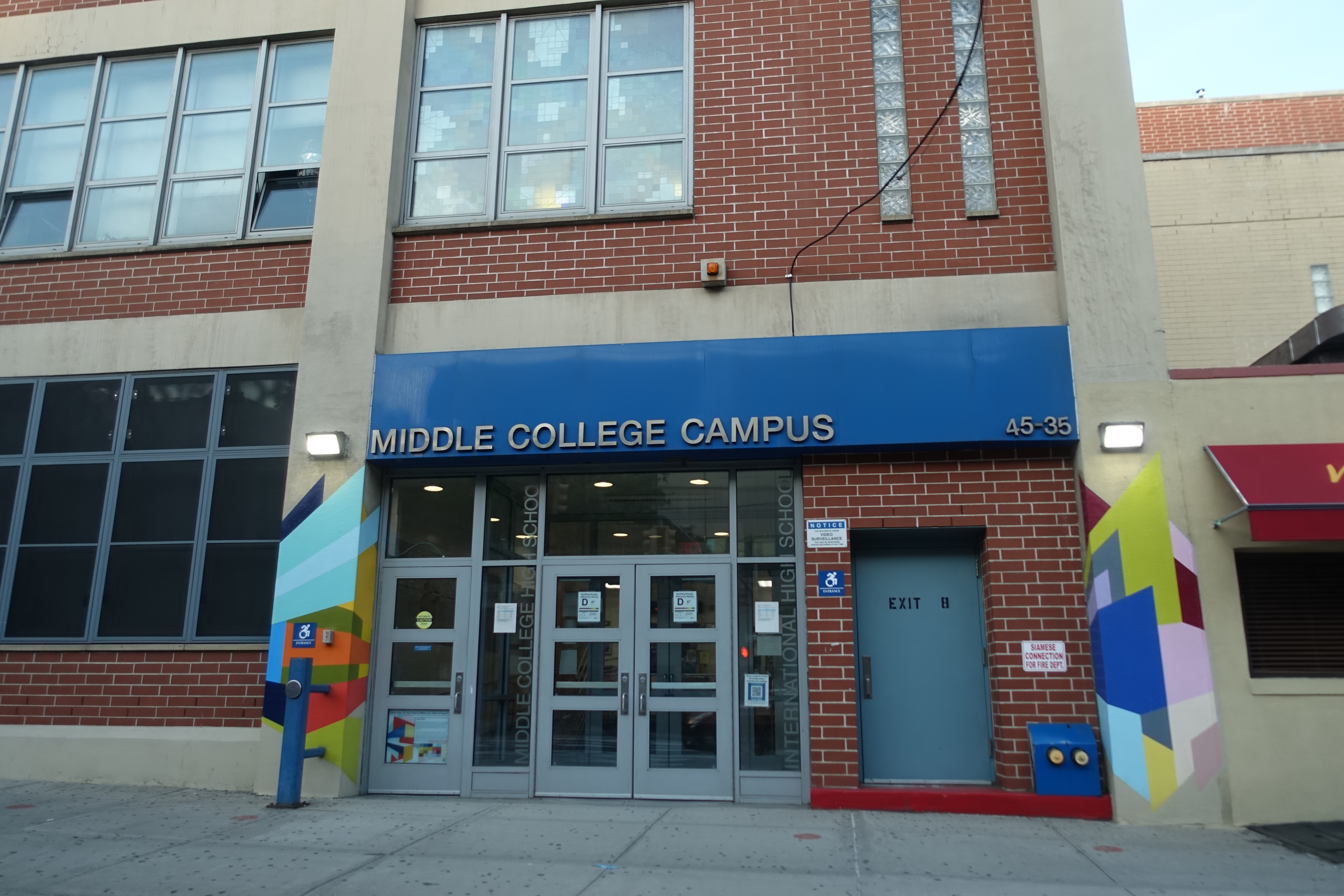

Location
- 45-35 Van Dam Street; Long Island City, Queens, NY 11101; United States; 40°44′42″N 73°56′02″W

Information
- Type: Public high school, (Specialized/Non-SHSAT)
- Established: 1974
- School district: 24
- School number: Q520
- Faculty: 30+
- Grades: 9–12
- Enrollment: 500+
- Colors: Red and White (Green, Black and/or White for sports teams to incorporate colors from all schools affiliated w/ athletics)
- Mascot: Panthers
- Nickname: MCHS
- Website: www.mchslic.com

Middle College High School at LaGuardia Community College (MCHS) is a public high school located on the campus of LaGuardia Community College in the Long Island City neighborhood in Queens, New York City. MCHS houses approximately 500 students in 45-35 Van Dam Street, the former L building of LaGuardia College's campus. It is a school within the New York City Department of Education. It is a member of the Middle College National Consortium.

== About ==
Housed on the LaGuardia Community College campus and founded in 1974, Middle College is designed for students who would flounder in a traditional high school setting. It is recognized for its success in turning around at-risk students and is one of 209 schools that the chancellor exempted from the citywide uniform curriculum mandated in 2003.

Middle College is a five-year, early college model where students take classes not only for high school but also for college credit at LaGuardia. After completing four years at Middle College, students can earn a diploma and at least 12 or more college credits. If they stay at the school for a fifth year, they can receive an associate's college degree as well.

As a member of the New York Performance Consortium, MCHS has a waiver from the city and state of New York for NY State Regents Exams. Students are only required to take and pass the NY State English Regents, another move away from traditional high-stakes testing. Under the waiver, students are required to create a portfolio of final projects from their classes during their time at MCHS.

Classes run on 55-minute schedules, with eight periods per day. Half-days are granted on Wednesday where classes run on 40-minutes.

== Athletics ==
Middle College High School athletics is affiliated with International High School and Robert F. Wagner High School located in Long Island City, NY. All teams play under the Middle College High School banner in the Public School Athletic League (PSAL). The school offers participation in 13 sports during the school year.

== The Internationals Network for Public Schools ==
The Internationals Network for Public Schools is an educational nonprofit supporting International high schools serving newly arrived immigrants who are English language learners (ELLs), in New York, California, Kentucky, Maryland, Virginia, and Washington, DC. Internationals Network also partners with other schools and districts across the country. Internationals Networks opened in 1985 on the campus of LaGuardia Community College. New York City's Department of Education and the City University of New York, in response to the many educational challenges faced by English language learners within district schools, opened this, another in Brooklyn and still another in The Bronx. In 2001 the Bill and Melinda Gates Foundation asked that they recreate this model across the country as a 501(c)3 nonprofit. Beyond those in NYC, these included California's Bay Area, Alexandria, Virginia, and Washington, DC.

The Internationals approach to teaching has been studied by researchers at Stanford University School Redesign Network and the Graduate Center of the City University of New York. The Stanford study, led by Linda Darling-Hammond and her team of researchers, found "the Internationals Network for Public Schools (Internationals) is an important model that originated in New York City and has shown itself to be both successful and adaptable" in California. Michelle Fine and a team of researchers from the Graduate Center of the City University of New York found that students at the three oldest International schools outperformed both English Language Learners and Native English Speakers (in New York City) in graduation rates and college going rates. The International schools also maintained lower drop out rates than ELL students and English only students.
