= United States Army Aviation and Missile Command =

U.S. Army's provider of aviation and missile equipment

U.S. Army Aviation and Missile Command
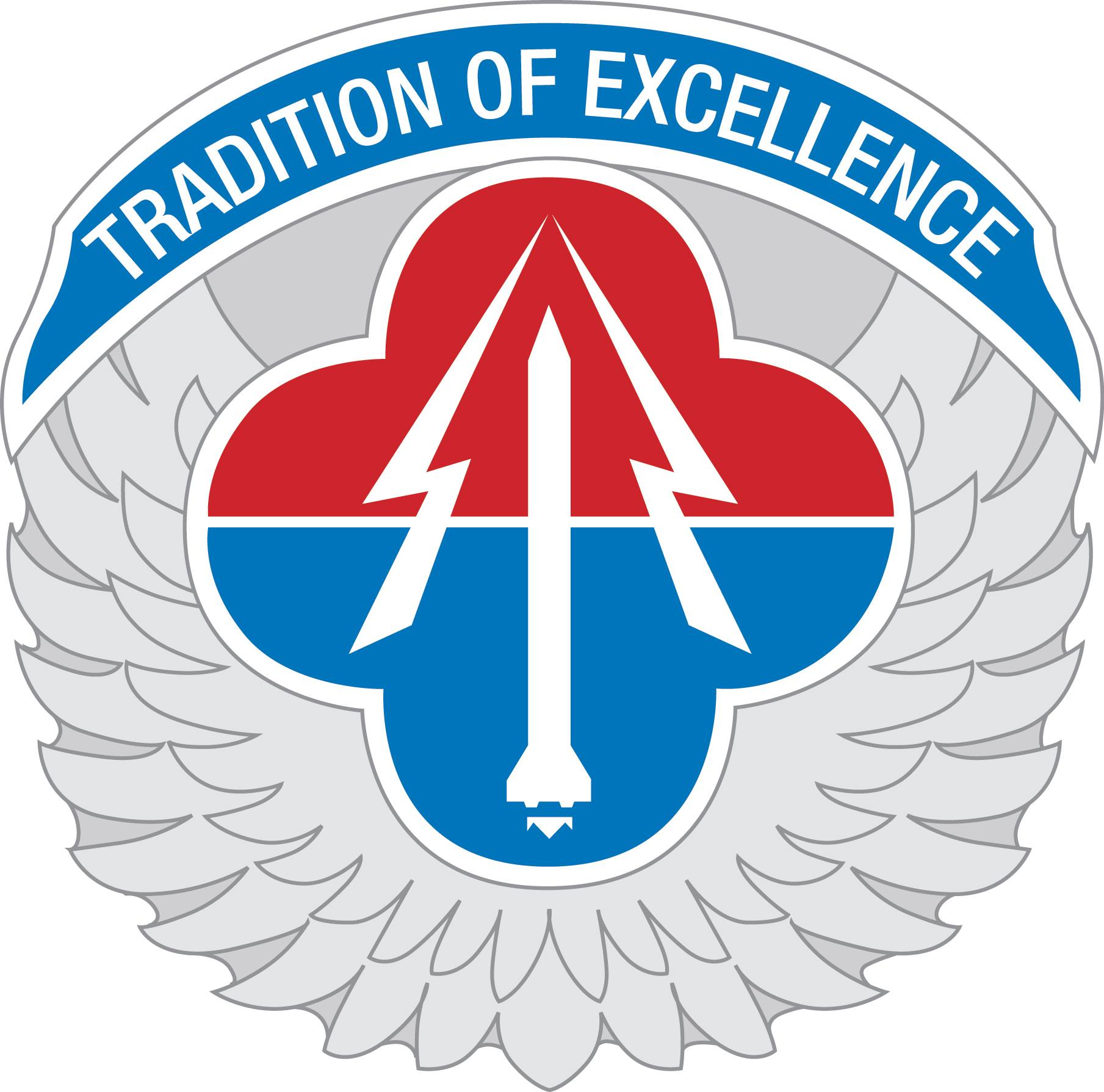
- AMCOM's distinctive unit insignia
- Active: 1997–present
- Country: United States
- Branch: United States Army
- Type: Major subordinate command
- Size: 7,700 civilian, 250 military, TBD contractors (as of 1996)
- Part of: U.S. Army Materiel Command
- Garrison/HQ: Redstone Arsenal, Alabama
- Website: amcom.army.mil

Commanders
- Commanding general: MG Lori L. Robinson
- Notable commanders: MG John Medaris (AOMC, 1958)

The U.S. Army Aviation and Missile Command (AMCOM) is a United States Army command responsible for managing the logistics, contracting and repair support of Army aviation, missiles, and unmanned systems. It is a "major subordinate command" of Army Materiel Command. The Aviation and Missile Command is headquartered at Redstone Arsenal, in Huntsville, Alabama.

== Operations ==
In 2019, the command's budget was $3.7 billion, and it maintained a global workforce of 15,000 military and civilian employees. Its installations include: Corpus Christi Army Depot, Letterkenny Army Depot, and the U.S. Army Aviation Center of Excellence at Fort Rucker, Alabama.

AMCOM is the leader in Foreign Military Sales, accounting for over 50 percent of total Army sales to allied forces and friendly foreign nations.

AMCOM's Test, Measurement, and Diagnostic Equipment (TMDE) Activity provides worldwide command and control over a broad metrology and calibration program.

AMCOM works closely with the DEVCOM Aviation and Missile Center (AvMC), which operates simulation facilities to evaluate missile components, such as seekers, in a variety of flight environments. AMCOM also has access to several wind tunnels to test full-size helicopters, a vertical motion simulator for flight control evaluation and a crash-testing tower used to improve safety.

== History ==
In October 1948, the Chief of Ordnance designated Redstone Arsenal as the center for ordnance research and development in the field of rockets. The Chief of Ordnance officially activated the arsenal on 1 June 1949, becoming the site of the Ordnance Rocket Center. On 28 October 1949, the Secretary of the Army approved the transfer of the Ordnance Research and Development Division Sub-Office (Rocket) at Fort Bliss, Texas, to Redstone Arsenal, becoming the Ordnance Guided Missile Center.

=== 1950s ===
On 22 October 1952, the Transportation Corps Army Aviation Field Service Office (TCAAFSO) was established at St. Louis, Missouri. It was a class II activity under the jurisdiction of the Chief of Transportation.

In March 1955, TCAAFSO consolidated with the Transportation Materiel Command (TMC), located in Marietta, Pennsylvania, (which had logistical responsibility for rail and marine equipment), forming the Transportation Supply and Maintenance Command (TSMC), headquartered at St. Louis, Missouri.

On 1 February 1956, the U.S. Army Ballistic Missile Agency (ABMA) was established at Redstone Arsenal. ABMA had a purely military mission: field the United States Army's first intermediate-range ballistic missile. Additionally, the agency was a class II activity under the jurisdiction of the Chief of Ordnance.

On 31 March 1958, the Army Ordnance Missile Command (AOMC) was established. Several organizations were transferred to AOMC, including: the Army Ballistic Missile Agency (ABMA), the Army Rocket and Guided Missile Agency (ARGMA), Redstone Arsenal, the Jet Propulsion Laboratory, and White Sands Proving Grounds.

From July to October 1958, ABMA's scientific and engineering staff (including Wernher von Braun and the Saturn I team at Redstone Arsenal) were moved to the newly created NASA Marshall Space Flight Center, located at the southern half of Redstone Arsenal. Nearly all of the Army Ballistic Missile Agency, including the Jet Propulsion Laboratory, were transferred to NASA, eliminating the prospect of an Army space program.

On 3 December 1958, the JPL transferred from AOMC to the National Aeronautics and Space Administration (NASA).

In 1958, the Pershing Project Manager's Office was formed. It was responsible for the overall management of the Pershing missile.

On 1 October 1959, the Transportation Supply and Maintenance Command (TSMC) was redesignated Transportation Materiel Command (TMC).

=== 1960s ===
On 11 December 1961, ABMA and ARGMA were disestablished, and their functions and personnel merged into AOMC.

On 1 January 1962, White Sands Missile Range (formerly White Sands Proving Ground until 1960), under jurisdiction of Army Ordnance Missile Command, was placed under the Chief of Ordnance.

On 23 May 1962, the Missile Command (MICOM) was established at Redstone Arsenal. It was responsible for managing the Army's missile platforms. MICOM was fully staffed and operational on 1 August 1962 when activated, at which time the Army Ordnance Missile Command (AOMC) ceased operations.

Additionally on 1 August 1962, the TMC was placed under jurisdiction of the Mobility Command (MOCOM), a major subordinate command of Army Materiel Command (AMC). On 1 November 1962, the Transportation Materiel Command (TMC) was redesignated Aviation and Surface Materiel Command (AVSCOM).

On 28 February 1964, the Aviation and Surface Materiel Command (AVSCOM) was redesignated Aviation Materiel Command (AVCOM).

On 1 August 1966, the assignment of AVCOM to the Mobility Command (MOCOM) was terminated, seeing AVCOM established as a major subordinate command of AMC.

On 23 September 1968, the Aviation Materiel Command was redesignated Aviation Systems Command (AVSCOM), which returned to the prior "AVSCOM" acronym.

=== 1970s ===
As part of a larger reorganization of the Army Materiel Command, on 31 January 1977, the missions and people of MICOM were split between the Missile Materiel Readiness Command (MIRCOM) and the Missile Research and Development Command (MIRADCOM).

On 1 July 1977, the Aviation Systems Command (AVSCOM) was discontinued. Its readiness mission combined with that of Troop Support Command (TROSCOM), forming the Troop Support and Aviation Materiel Readiness Command (TSARCOM). The aviation research and development mission of AVSCOM was assigned to the Aviation Research and Development Command (AVRADCOM).

AMC decided that the most effective way to meet the Army missile program's requirements was under the single command concept. Consequently, MIRCOM and MIRADCOM were inactivated, and their facilities, missions, and personnel combined in place under the reinstituted MICOM on 1 July 1979.

=== 1980s ===
On 1 March 1984, the Aviation Systems Command (AVSCOM) was reestablished. The command received all missions and activities of AVRADCOM, as well as the aviation-related missions and elements of TSARCOM.

On 1 May 1987, program executive offices (PEOs) were provisionally established, several of which aligned with AVSCOM and MICOM.

=== 1990s ===
On 1 October 1992, the Aviation and Troop Command (ATCOM) was formed at St. Louis, Missouri, combining the mission of the Aviation Systems Command (AVSCOM) and Troop Support Command (TROSCOM).

On 8 September 1995, Congress approved the 1995 Base Realignment and Closure Commission list, proposing ATCOM would inactivate, and its mission and resources would relocate to Redstone Arsenal.

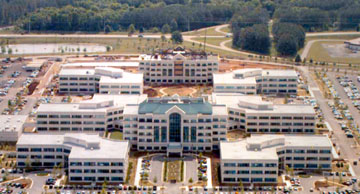
AMCOM headquarters located at Redstone Arsenal, Alabama

On 17 July 1997, the Aviation and Missile Command (AMCOM) was provisionally established, merging the Aviation and Troop Command (ATCOM) and the Missile Command (MICOM). (Note: According to ATCOM's FY1996 Annual Command History, in September 1996, the commanding general of MICOM proposed that Missile and Aviation Command (MAVCOM) be the name of the merged command. However, Headquarters, AMC preferred the BRAC (Base Realignment and Closure Commission) name—the Aviation and Missile Command (AMCOM)—which was instituted on 17 July 1997.)

On 1 October 1997, the Aviation and Missile Command (AMCOM) was permanently established at Redstone Arsenal.

=== 2000s ===
On 16 June 2005, the Aviation and Missile Life Cycle Management Command (AMCOM LCMC) was established. It comprised all of the elements of the Aviation and Missile Command, the Program Executive Office for Aviation, and the Program Executive Office for Missiles and Space.

== Organization ==
AMCOM's main organizations are organized into centers:

- Acquisition Center – responsible for contracting support.
- AMCOM Logistics Center (ALC) – responsible for logistics support.

The U.S. Army Aviation and Missile Life Cycle Management Command is a LCMC. Thus it has an associated contracting center. This LCMC, Aviation and Missile Life Cycle Management Command, was formerly Aviation and Missile Command. This LCMC purchases about $1 billion worth of aircraft and missile parts each year.

== List of commanding generals ==
No.	Commanding General		Term		
No.	Portrait	Name	Took office	Left office	Duration
As U.S. Army Ordnance Missile Command
1	John Bruce Medaris	Major General; John Bruce Medaris	31 March 1958	31 January 1960	1 year, 306 days
As U.S. Army Aviation and Missile Command
1	Emmitt E. Gibson	Major General; Emmitt E. Gibson	17 July 1997	9 July 1999	1 year, 357 days
2	Julian A. Sullivan, Jr.	Major General; Julian A. Sullivan, Jr.	9 July 1999	10 September 2001	2 years, 63 days
3	Larry J. Dodgen	Major General; Larry J. Dodgen	10 September 2001	1 December 2003	2 years, 82 days
4	James H. Pillsbury	Major General; James H. Pillsbury	1 December 2003	19 July 2007	3 years, 230 days
5	James R. Myles	Major General; James R. Myles	19 July 2007	10 September 2010	3 years, 53 days
6	James E. Rogers	Major General; James E. Rogers	10 September 2010	1 June 2012	1 year, 265 days
7	Lynn A. Collyar	Major General; Lynn A. Collyar	1 June 2012	12 June 2014	2 years, 11 days
8	James M. Richardson	Major General; James M. Richardson	12 June 2014	18 February 2016	1 year, 251 days
9	Douglas Gabram	Major General; Douglas Gabram	18 February 2016	14 February 2019	2 years, 361 days
10	William Marriott	William Marriott; Acting	14 February 2019	10 June 2019	116 days
11	K. Todd Royar	Major General; K. Todd Royar	10 June 2019	12 August 2022	3 years, 63 days
12	Thomas W. O'Connor Jr.	Major General; Thomas W. O'Connor Jr.	12 August 2022	10 July 2024	1 year, 333 days
13	Lori L. Robinson	Major General; Lori L. Robinson	10 July 2024	Incumbent	2 years, 108 days

== See also ==
- Anti-aircraft warfare
- Terminal High Altitude Area Defense (THAAD)
