= John Bruce Medaris =

American military officer and priest

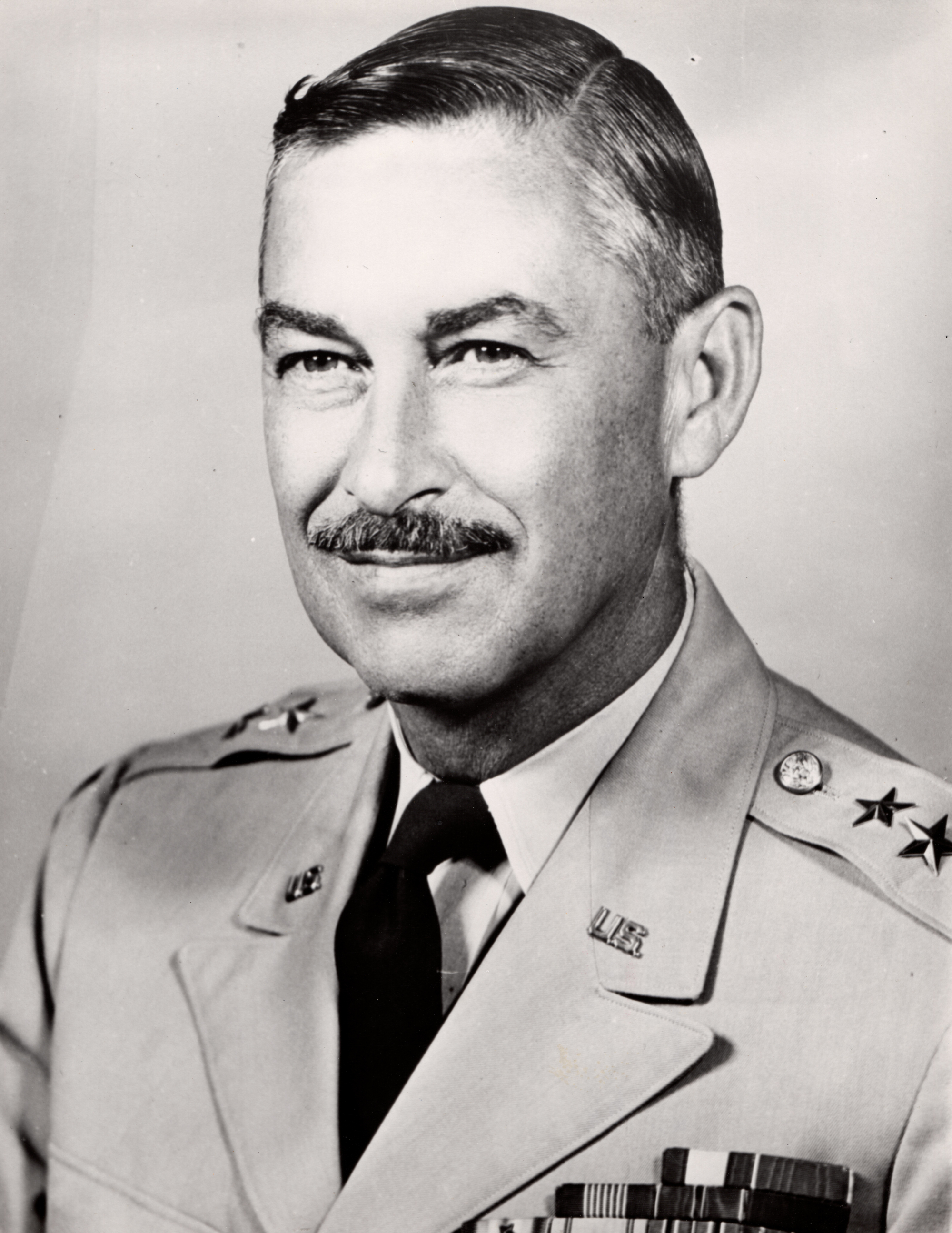
Medaris as Commanding General, U.S. Army Ballistic Missile Agency c. 1958

John Bruce Medaris (12 May 1902 – 11 July 1990) was an officer in the United States Army during World War II and post-war government administrator overseeing development of ballistic missiles.

During World War II Medaris was a colonel in the ordnance corps of the First Army, participating in the North Africa campaign, the Allied invasion of Sicily, Normandy landings, the Battle of the Bulge, and the invasion of Germany.

In 1955 Medaris assumed command of the Army Ballistic Missile Agency at the Redstone Arsenal in Huntsville, Alabama. Under his supervision, Wernher von Braun and the German rocket team brought to the USA through Operation Paperclip developed the Jupiter missile in 1958.

After the Defense Department removed responsibilities for long-range ballistic missiles from the Army, Medaris retired and wrote a critical memoir.

Several years after retirement, Medaris was ordained as an Anglican priest.

== Early life ==
John Bruce Medaris was born in Milford, Ohio on 12 May 1902 to William Roudebush Medaris, a lawyer of Basque ancestry, and Jessie LeSourd Medaris, a school teacher and accountant. His parents divorced when he was four, leaving mother and son in impoverished circumstances.

Medaris Bruce was partly raised by his maternal grandmother, who encouraged him to be ambitious and independent from an early age. He began working at age 9 as a paper boy. Medaris later became a lamplighter, mail handler for the railroad, trolley conductor, and taxi driver, all the while attending school full-time.

Medaris joined a junior military organization and practiced daily on the rifle range. In his memoir he described his lifelong fascination with weapons.

== First military career ==
In World War I, Medaris enlisted in the US Marine Corps, claiming to be over 18 when he was really just 16. Serving as a rifleman, he was deployed to France, but never saw combat. Medaris mustered out in August 1919.

Medaris entered Ohio State University to study mechanical and electrical engineering. While at Ohio State, he met his first wife. Medaris soon joined the Ohio National Guard. After receiving an army commission in a nationwide contest, he was sworn in as a Second Lieutenant in the regular army in September 1921.

Medaris served with the 29th Infantry regiment at Fort Benning, Georgia, until 1924 when he was transferred to the 33rd regiment based in what was then the Panama Canal Zone. While in Panama, Medaris learned Spanish and became an equestrian. In 1927 he received approval for a transfer to the Ordnance corps.

== Civilian interlude ==
Soon after his last transfer, Medaris left the Army to work for a General Motors Export Corporation dealership in Colombia. He and his wife spent 18 months there, then returned to the United States.

After the Wall Street crash of 1929, Medaris was ruined financially and got divorced. In 1930, he remarried and started working in management at the Kroger Corporation, He eventually bought an automobile dealership, but it failed in 1938. Still an Army Reserve officer, Medaris then applied to return to active duty.

== World War II ==
Medaris was appointed as a captain in the Ordnance Corps on 11 July 1939, and worked for three years with regional industries to facilitate U.S. rearmament. Following the Japanese Attack on Pearl Harbor, he fought for deployment to a war zone, "by making myself thoroughly obnoxious." In December 1942, Medaris sailed for North Africa to support the II Army Corps from a base in Algiers.

After the Battle of Kasserine Pass, now a colonel, Medaris led the effort to secure emergency resupply while his ordnance teams worked to repair tanks and guns. General Omar Bradley personally commended him. Following the Allied invasion of Sicily, during which Medaris served under George S. Patton, he was summoned to England. Bradley was preparing US First Army for the Normandy invasion and wanted Medaris as his Chief of Ordnance.

Medaris landed on Omaha Beach on 7 June 1944. During the Battle of Normandy he dealt with an exploding ammunition dump and severe shortages after a storm destroyed the Mulberry harbour constructed off Omaha Beach. Medaris also dealt with the vulnerability of American tanks to German fire while attempting to scale the dense hedgerows in Normandy. A sergeant suggested welding sharp "tusks" to the tanks that could cut through hedges – creating the "Culin rhino device". Bradley ordered Medaris to outfit tanks still in the UK. Medaris estimated his crews would need 500 tons of welding rod to outfit the armored divisions and persuaded the general and Pentagon to supply them.

During his time in Europe, Medaris and his unit narrowly missed being hit by an off-course V-2 rocket. Finally, Medaris was responsible for selecting the location for the main ordnance dump that supplied the Allied assault across the Rhine River into Germany.

Medaris received a Distinguished Service Medal for his service in the European Theater of Operations.

== Post war ==
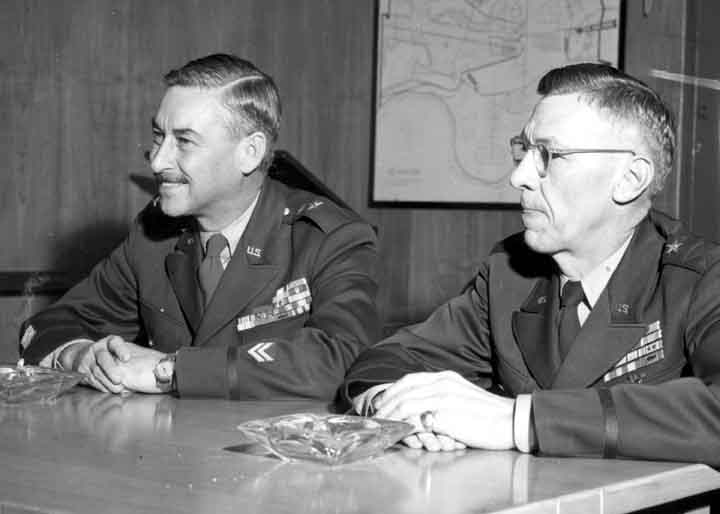
John Bruce Medaris (left) and Holger Toftoy (1956)

From 1949 to 1952, Medaris served as a military attaché in Argentina.

Medaris returned to the Pentagon just in time to address the shortfall in the provision of ammunition to the U.S. forces bogged down in the Korean War. His service during that emergency earned him a promotion to brigadier general.

After the Korean armistice in July 1953 Medaris turned his attention to the newest category of ordnance – guided missiles – only to be frustrated that the Army seemed to be losing out to the other services. He was contemplating retirement a third time when the Army promoted him to two-star general and asked him to take command of the 1,600 scientists and engineers at the Redstone Arsenal effective 1 February 1956.

== Army ballistic missile command ==
Medaris was said to be an outspoken commander who never broke discipline, and an excellent manager. He and leading German rocket scientist Wernher von Braun became close friends during their years at Huntsville. (Note: see also Michael J. Neufeld, Von Braun: Dreamer of Space, Engineer of War (New York: A. A. Knopf, 2007), pages 303–36, 340–42; Frederick I. Ordway III and Mitchell R. Sharpe, The Rocket Team (New York: Crowell, 1979), pp. 377–90; and Medaris, New Command, pages 98–112.)

In 1956 Medaris and von Braun formally proposed launching seven satellites during 1957-58 only to be expressly forbidden. A distinguished delegation including Secretary of Defense Neil McElroy was visiting Redstone Arsenal on 4 October when news flashed that the Soviets had launched Sputnik 1. As Medaris recalled, von Braun's frustration poured forth in a torrent of words: "We knew they were going to do it! Vanguard will never make it. We have the hardware on the shelf. For God's sake turn us loose and let us do something. We can put up a satellite in sixty days, Mr. McElroy." Medaris cautiously interjected, "No, Wernher, ninety days."

On 3 November the Soviets launched Sputnik 2 with a payload of 1,100 pounds, proving they now had the capability to visit nuclear destruction on North America. Senator Lyndon B. Johnson presided over sensational hearings to inquire how it was the United States was losing the "space race" to the Soviet Union. The Pentagon, under intense pressure, at last gave Medaris authorization to prepare, but still not execute, a satellite launch.

The Pentagon finally gave Medaris a green light to launch with a military rocket. The Huntsville team assembled the Juno launch system, which was a Redstone with small upper stages, at Cape Canaveral only to be thwarted by high winds until the evening of 31 January 1958, when the countdown was completed and the rocket arced perfectly into the night. Ninety minutes later, confirmation came from the Jet Propulsion Laboratory's radar station in California that Explorer 1, America's first satellite, was transmitting from orbit.

Medaris became head of the Army Ordnance Missile Command on 31 March 1958, with full authority over the ABMA, White Sands Missile Range, Jet Propulsion Laboratory, and the Army Missile Firing Laboratory at Cape Canaveral, and responsibility for all Army programs in missiles and space. During 1958 and 1959 the latter including more Explorer satellites and a series of Pioneer lunar probes. In May 1961 a Mercury Redstone rocket launched the first astronaut Alan Shepard on his suborbital flight. As early as December 1957 von Braun had drafted – and Medaris promoted – a space program that called for a soft lunar landing by 1960, a two-man satellite by 1962, Saturn rockets capable of boosting ten tons into orbit by 1963, an orbiting space station by 1965, a three-man expedition to the moon by 1967, and a permanent crewed lunar base by 1971. That inspired an even more elaborate Army plan called Project Horizon in June 1959.

Medaris testified before Congress, in public appearances, and through the military chain of command. He advocated tirelessly in favor of keeping the ABMA team intact within a single, unified military and civilian space program so as to minimize redundancy, bureaucracy, and waste. The Eisenhower administration chose instead to divide the space program between military and civilian agencies and among the armed services restricting the Army to short-range rockets.

In July 1958 Congress created a new agency, the National Aeronautics and Space Administration, and gave it responsibility for all scientific programs and non-military launch vehicles. The Jet Propulsion Laboratory was transferred to NASA in December 1958, and the German rocket team in 1960, which became NASA's George C. Marshall Space Flight Center.

The Army offered Medaris a promotion to three-star general and a desk job in the Pentagon. Instead, he retired from the Army on 31 January 1960 and wrote a memoir called Countdown for Decision.

== Personal life and calling to the priesthood ==
Medaris married Gwendolyn Hunter in 1920, who gave birth to a daughter they named Marilyn. The marriage ended in 1930. He remarried a year later to Virginia Rose Smith by whom he eventually had two children, Marta Virginia and John Bruce Jr.

After retirement from the Army, Medaris worked briefly in Washington and New York before moving to Maitland, Florida, where he became an active parishioner in the Church of the Good Shepherd. He studied theology, and was ordained a deacon in 1969 and priest in 1970.

Upon his death in 1990 he was interred in Arlington National Cemetery with his wife Virginia Smith.

== Awards ==
- Legion of Merit (1943) for conduct after Kasserine Pass
- Bronze Star (1944) for meritorious service in preparation for D-Day
- Soldier's Medal (1944) for Battle of the Bulge
- Distinguished Service Medal (1945) for meritorious service in the European theater
- Decorations from the governments of France and Luxemburg
- Legion of Merit with Oak Leaf Cluster (1958) for command of the ABMA
- Navy Commendation (1958) for service to the Fleet Ballistic Missile Weapons System
- Air Force Legion of Merit (1960) for leadership of the Jupiter Missile Program
- Honorary Doctorate of Science, Rollins College, 1958
- Honorary Doctorate of Science, New Mexico State University, 1958
- Honorary Doctorate of Laws, University of Chattanooga, 1960
- Ordnance Corps Hall of Fame, inducted May 1961.
- Honored by National Space Club and the Smithsonian Institution for lifetime achievement and promotion of public awareness in the U.S. space program
- Honorary Doctorate of Space Science, Florida Institute of Technology, 1963
