= Army Ballistic Missile Agency =

United States Army agency (1956–1961)

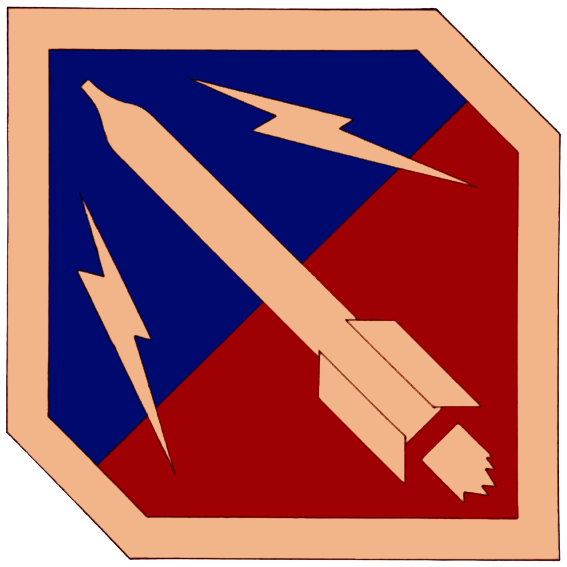

Military overview
- Formed: 1 February 1956; 70 years ago
- Dissolved: 1961
- Jurisdiction: Government of the United States
- Headquarters: Madison County, Alabama

The Army Ballistic Missile Agency (ABMA) was formed to develop the U.S. Army's first large ballistic missile. The agency was established at Redstone Arsenal on 1 February 1956, and commanded by Major General John B. Medaris with Wernher von Braun as technical director.

== History ==
The Redstone missile was the first major project assigned to ABMA. The Redstone was a direct descendant of the V-2 missile developed by the von Braun team in Germany during World War II. After the Naval Research Laboratory's Project Vanguard was chosen by the DoD Committee on Special Capabilities, over the ABMA's proposal to use a modified Redstone ballistic missile as a satellite launch vehicle, ABMA was ordered to stop work on launchers for satellites and focus, instead, on military missiles.

Von Braun continued work on the design for what became the Jupiter-C rocket. This was a three-stage rocket, designed to test Jupiter missile components which, by coincidence, could be used to launch a satellite in the Juno I configuration (that is, with an added fourth stage). In September 1956, a Jupiter-C was launched with a 14 kg (31 lb) dummy satellite on a suborbital flight. It was generally believed that the ABMA could have put a satellite into orbit at that time, had the U.S. government allowed ABMA to do so. A year later, the Soviets launched Sputnik 1. When the Vanguard rocket failed, a Redstone-based Jupiter-C with an added fourth stage and thus designated as Juno I rocket, launched America's first satellite, Explorer 1, on 1 February 1958 (GMT). Redstone was later used as a launch vehicle in Project Mercury. Redstone was also deployed by the U.S. Army as the PGM-11, the first missile to carry a nuclear warhead.

Studies began in 1956 for a replacement for the Redstone missile. Initially called the Redstone-S (S for solid), the name was changed to MGM-31 Pershing and a contract was awarded to The Martin Company, beginning a program that lasted 34 years.

In early 1958, NACA's "Stever Committee" included consultation from the ABMA's large booster program, headed by Wernher von Braun. Von Braun's Group was referred to as the "Working Group on Vehicular Program".

In March 1958, ABMA was placed under the new U.S. Army Ordnance Missile Command (AOMC) along with Redstone Arsenal, the Jet Propulsion Laboratory, White Sands Proving Ground, and the Army Rocket and Guided Missile Agency (ARGMA). General Medaris was placed in command of AOMC and BG John A. Barclay took command of ABMA.

On 1 July 1960, the AOMC space-related missions and most of its employees, facilities, and equipment were transferred to NASA, forming the George C. Marshall Space Flight Center (MSFC). Wernher von Braun was named MSFC director.

BG Richard M. Hurst took command of ABMA from May 1960 until December 1961 when both ABMA and ARGMA were abolished and the remnants were folded directly into AOMC. In 1962, AOMC (the part that hadn't been transferred to NASA) was restructured into the new U.S. Army Missile Command (MICOM).

=== Redstone ===
In the aftermath of World War II, a number of German rocket scientists and engineers were moved to the United States as part of Operation Paperclip. Rocketry was at that time considered to be a sort of long-range artillery, and naturally fell to the Army to explore. The group was settled at Fort Bliss, Texas – where they aided General Electric's Project Hermes efforts to build and test a variety of V-2-derived designs at the nearby White Sands Proving Ground.

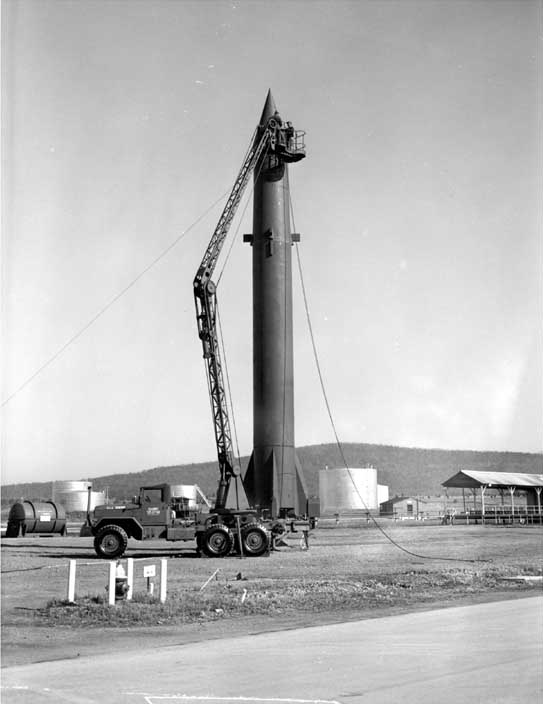
Army troops prepare a Redstone missile. Like the V-2 it was based on, Redstone was relatively mobile.

Around the same time, North American Aviation (NAA) won the contract to build a long-range cruise missile that became the SM-64 Navaho. This used ramjet power and needed to be boosted up to operational speed by a rocket. Their Propulsion Division was given two V-2 engines to work with to meet this requirement, along with a wealth of research papers from the original V-2 engine team. The NAA team discovered that a major upgrade to the V-2's original Model 39 engine was planned through the use of a new fuel injector design, but the Germans were not able to cure lingering combustion problems. Attacking this task, NAA successfully solved the problems and began using this new injector. This became the XLR-41 Phase III engine, which provided 330,000 N (74,000 lb_{f}) of thrust, one third greater than the Model 39, and was lighter and smaller than the German design.

The outbreak of the Korean War in June 1950 led to calls for the rapid deployment of new missiles, and the U.S. Army responded by developing a requirement for a ballistic missile with 800 km (500 mi) range while carrying a 230 kg (510 lb) warhead that could be operational as rapidly as possible. The fastest solution was to provide the German team with anything they needed to achieve this goal by adapting the V-2 design. The team, under the leadership of Wernher von Braun, began work on the problem at Fort Bliss. In 1951, they moved to the Redstone Arsenal in Huntsville, Alabama, home to the Army's Ordnance commands. Initially known as the Ordnance Guided Missile Center, then the Guided Missile Development Division (GMDD), in 1956 they finally became the Army Ballistic Missile Agency, or ABMA.

Taking the XLR-41, renamed as the NA-75-110 in U.S. Army use, they wrapped it in the largest airframe it could lift, increasing fuel load and extending the range. The result was essentially a larger version of the V-2. As tensions of the Cold War mounted, the Army changed the requirement to be able to carry the smallest nuclear warheads in the inventory – with a warhead weight of 3,100 kg (6,800 lb), range was reduced to only 282 km (175 mi). Design work was complete in 1952 and on 8 April 1952 it became known as the SSM-G-14 Redstone (Surface-to-Surface Missile, G for ground). The first ABMA-built prototype flew in August 1953, the first production-line model from Chrysler in July 1956, and the Redstone entered service in 1958.

=== Navaho to Jupiter ===
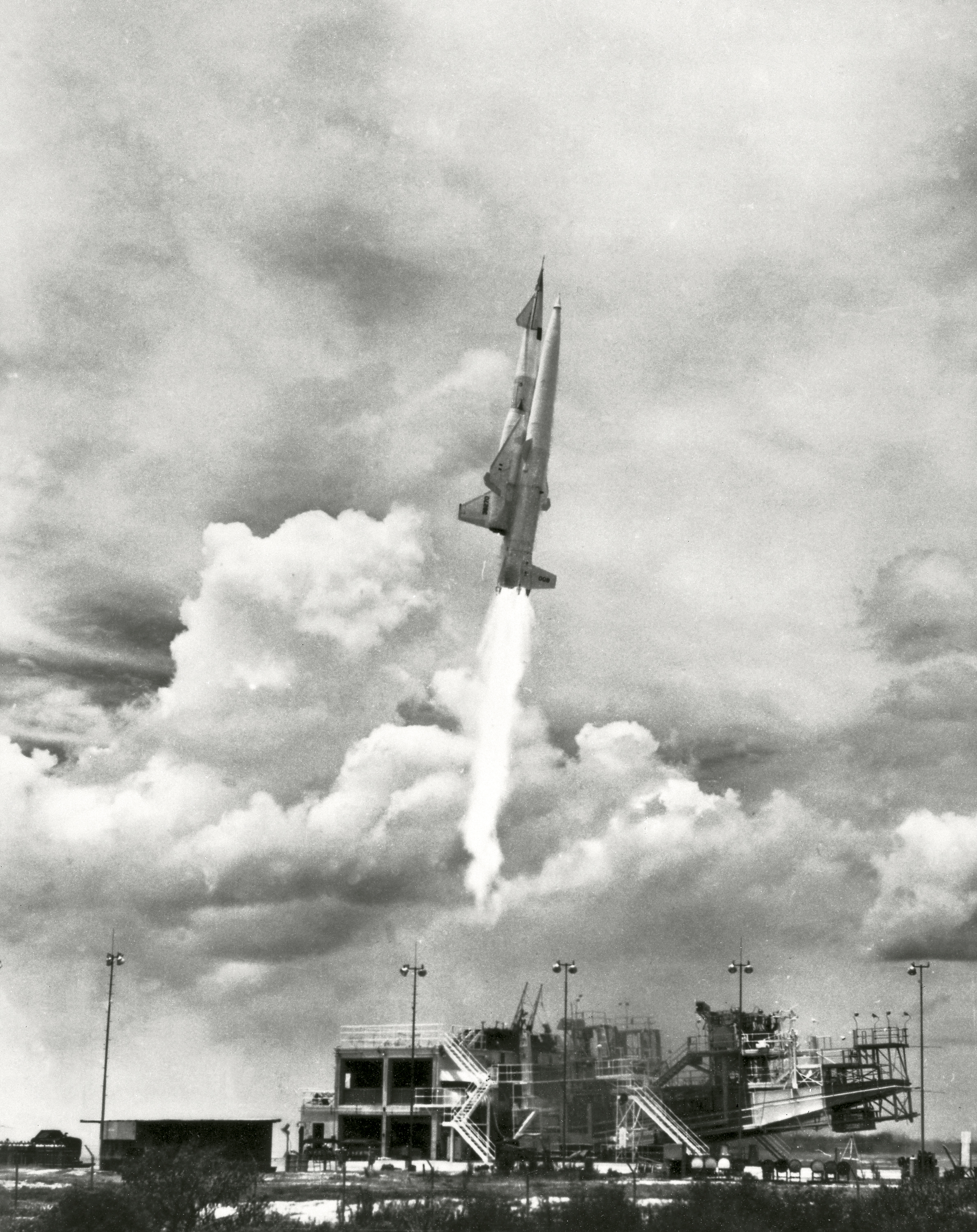
Navaho's booster engines proved to be the only lasting success of the project.

While the PGM-11 Redstone program continued, NAA was receiving a continual stream of orders from the U.S. Air Force to extend the range and payload of their Navaho design. This required a much larger missile, and a much larger booster to launch it. As a result, NAA was continually introducing new versions of their engines. By the mid-1950s, NAA had a version known as the XLR-43 running at 530,000 N (120,000 lb_{f}) thrust, while further reducing weight at the same time. Much of this was due to the introduction of the tubular wall combustion chamber, which was much lighter than the cast-steel designs of the V-2, while also offering much better cooling which allowed the combustion rate, and thus thrust, to be increased.

While the Navajo program dragged on, NAA split the team into three groups, Rocketdyne handled engines, Autonetics developed inertial navigation systems (INS) and the Missile Division retained the Navaho itself. With this breakup of duties, both Rocketdyne and Autonetics were soon asked to provide solutions for other projects. In particular, the Air Force asked Rocketdyne to provide an engine for their SM-65 Atlas which they did by adapting the XLR-43 to run on JP-4 instead of alcohol, becoming the LR89. In addition to the switch to JP-4, the engine did away with the hydrogen peroxide system of the XLR-41 that powered the turbopumps and replaced it with a turbine that ran on the rocket fuel itself, simplifying the overall design.

Von Braun's team initially considered making a version of the Redstone using the LR89 and adding a second stage, stretching the range to 1,900 km (1,200 mi). But ongoing work on the LR89 suggested that the engine could be further improved, and in 1954, the Army approached Rocketdyne to provide a similar design with a thrust of 600,000 N (130,000 lb_{f}). Over this period the weight of nuclear warheads was rapidly falling, and by combining this engine with a warhead of 910 kg (2,010 lb) they could build a single-stage missile able to reach 2,800 km (1,700 mi) while being significantly less complicated and easier to handle in the field than a two-stage model. This engine was continually upgraded, ultimately reaching 670,000 N (150,000 lb_{f}). This last model, known to the Army as the NAA-150-200, became much better known by its Rocketdyne model number, S-3.

=== Initial IRBM battles ===
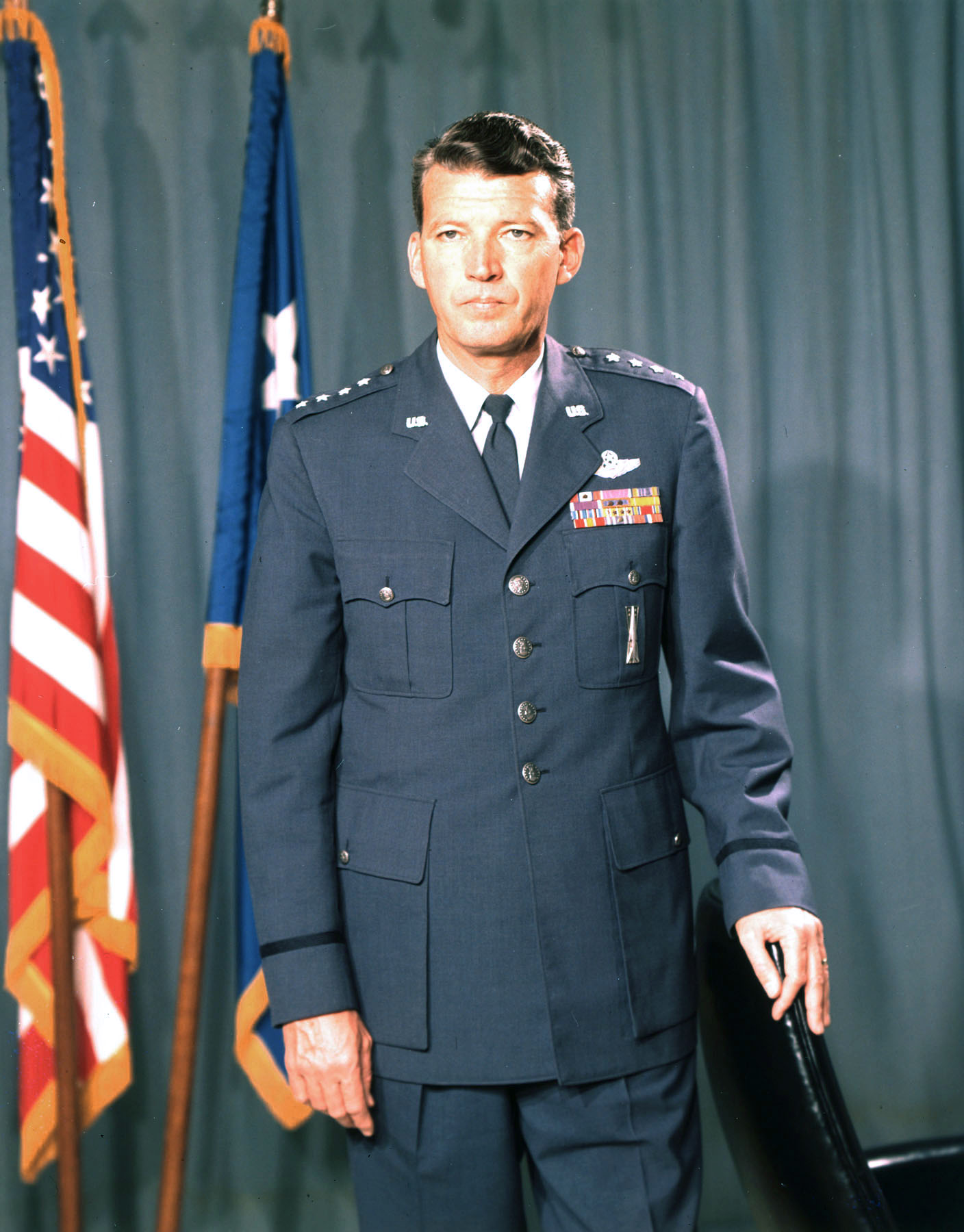
Schriever felt the Army's offer to develop Jupiter for them was too good to be true, and the development of their own Thor would lead to many interservice fights.

In January 1955, the Air Force's Scientific Advisory Group (SAG) urged the Air Force to develop a medium-range ballistic missile (MRBM). They felt that it was far less technically risky than the SM-65 Atlas ICBM the Air Force was developing, and would enter service earlier. General Bernard Schriever, leader of the U.S. Air Force's Western Development Division in charge of Atlas development, was opposed to the concept, feeling that it would divert resources from the Atlas efforts.

In February 1955, the United Kingdom expressed an interest in obtaining an intermediate-range ballistic missile (IRBM) that could strike the Soviet Union from bases within the United Kingdom. This added impetus to desires for a MRBM, but this ran afoul of ongoing concerns about the sharing of nuclear information. Later that same month, the initial report of the Killian Committee was published. Among its many recommendations was the statement that the U.S. should build an IRBM as soon as possible. They based their argument on the fact that an IRBM could strike any point in Europe from any point in Europe. It was believed that this type of weapon would be highly desirable to the Soviets and thus since they were very likely to develop such a system, the U.S. should build one first.

In March 1955, the Army approached the Air Force about their MRBM design. When the Air Force had split from the Army in 1947, the two forces had a tacit agreement that the Army would be responsible for designs flying less than 1,600 km (990 mi), while the Air Force took over those with greater range. The new design's 2,400 km (1,500 mi) range placed it within the umbrella of the Air Force, so the Army offered to design and build the missile for operation by the Air Force. In spite of addressing the calls for an Air Force M/IRBM, and that taking it over would keep the Army out of the long-range missile game, General Schriever dismissed the idea outright:

It would be naive to think that the Army would develop a weapon and then turn it over to the Air Force for operation. Therefore, I strongly recommend that our relationship with Redstone [Arsenal] remain on an exchange of information basis.

As the calls for an IRBM continued, Schriever finally acquiesced and suggested that an IRBM could be created out of a down-scaled Atlas, thereby avoiding any duplication of effort. Contract tenders for such designs were sent out in May 1955. However, by July 1955, the Joint Coordinating Committee on Ballistic Missiles concluded that there were enough differences between the two concepts that an entirely new design should be built for the role.

The Army, meanwhile, did not give up on their design. In September 1955, von Braun briefed the U.S. Secretary of Defense and the Armed Services Policy Council on long range missiles, pointing out that a 2,400 km (1,500 mi) missile was a logical extension of the Redstone. He proposed a six-year development program costing US$240 million (equivalent to $2.88 billion in 2025) with a total production of 50 prototype missiles.

=== Jupiter-A ===
To test various parts of the Jupiter equipment, ABMA began launching Jupiter hardware on previously planned Redstone development missions. These were known under the name Jupiter-A. Among the systems tested by Jupiter-A were the ST-80 INS, angle-of-attack sensors, fusing systems and the explosive bolts that separated the booster from the upper stage.

ABMA and the Air Force disagree on how many flights were part of the Jupiter-A series. ABMA lists Redstone RS-11 as the first Jupiter-A launch on 22 September 1955, with RS-12 following on 5 December 1955. This means these flights took place before the Jupiter program was even official. The Air Force states the first was on 14 March 1956. Likewise the Air Force does not claim the last three Redstone flights, RS-46, CC-43 and CC-48, to be part of the Jupiter-A program, while ABMA lists them.

In total, ABMA lists 25 launches as part of the Jupiter-A series, every Redstone launched between September 1955 and 11 June 1958. The Air Force lists only the 20 in the middle of this period.

=== Jupiter-C ===
While development of the Jupiter missile was underway, design of the reentry vehicle was progressing rapidly. In order to gain test data on the design before the missile would be ready to launch it, ABMA designed the Jupiter-C, short for "Jupiter Composite Test Vehicle". This was not really a Jupiter at all, but a Redstone with an 2.4 m (7 ft 10 in) stretch to hold more fuel, topped with two upper stages consisting of clusters of small solid fuel rockets, topped by a subscale version of the Jupiter reentry vehicle.

The bare Jupiter-C flew for the first time on 20 September 1956, flying further and faster than any previous rocket. The complete system with a dummy reentry vehicle flew twice in 1957, the first on 15 May and the second on 8 August 1957. The second of these tests also used a new three-stage upper that had been designed for the Juno I rocket, a further expansion of the Jupiter-C intended for future space launches. It was a Juno I that launched the U.S.'s first satellite, Explorer 1, on 1 February 1958 (GMT).

=== Jupiter versus Thor ===
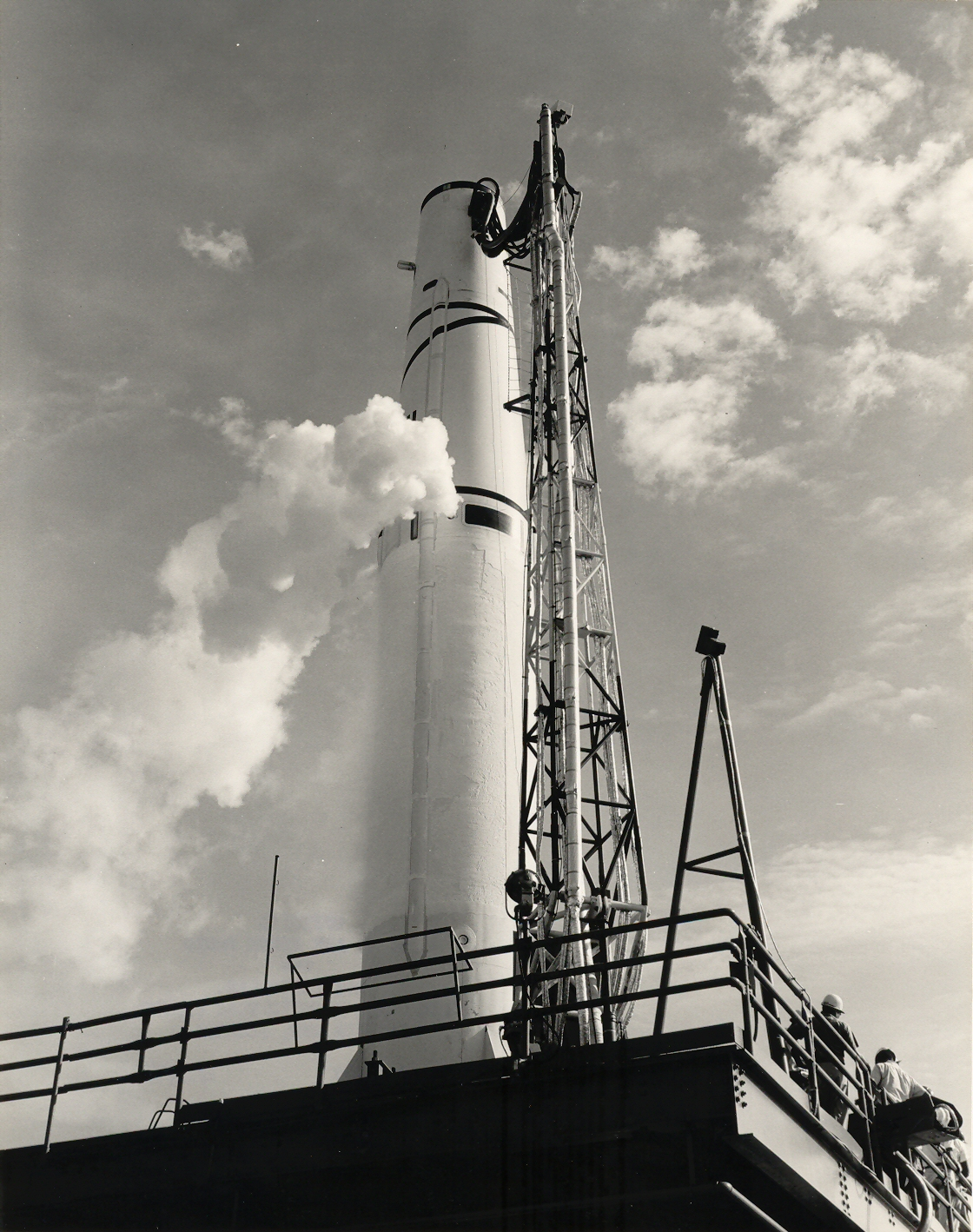
Thor was designed from the start to be a countervalue weapon, aimed at Soviet cities. Unlike Jupiter, Thor was designed to be transported by aircraft, specifically the Douglas C-124 Globemaster II.

ABMA's work on the Jupiter progressed throughout the U.S. Navy's brief involvement, especially work on the INS. The goal had originally been to match Redstone's accuracy at the Jupiter's much extended range, but as development continued it became clear the ABMA team could improve on that considerably. This led to a period in which "The Army would lay down a particular accuracy, and wait for our arguments whether it was possible. We had to promise a lot, but were fortunate".

This process ultimately delivered a design intended to provide 0.8 km (0.50 mi) accuracy at the full range, a radius one fourth that of the best INS designs being used by the Air Force. The system was so accurate that a number of observers expressed their skepticism about the Army's goals, with the Weapons Systems Evaluation Group (WSEG) suggesting they were hopelessly optimistic.

The Army's desire for accuracy was a side-effect of their mission concept for nuclear weapons. They saw the weapons as part of a large-scale battle in Europe, in which both sides would use nuclear weapons during a limited war that did not include the use of strategic weapons on each other's cities. In that case, "if wars were to be kept limited, such weapons would have to be capable of hitting only tactical targets". This approach saw support of a number of influential theorists, notably Henry Kissinger, and was seized on as a uniquely Army mission.

Although the Air Force had started their own IRBM to compete with Jupiter, development was lackadaisical. They had the much more impressive Atlas to worry about, and even that saw relatively little interest in a force dominated by Strategic Air Command's bomber-centric strategic vision. Curtis LeMay, leader of SAC, was generally uninterested in Atlas, considering it useful only as a way to blast holes in the Soviet defensive systems to let his bombers through. But as the Jupiter program began to progress they became increasingly concerned that it would enter service before Atlas, potentially handing the Army some sort of strategic role in the short term.

The Air Force vision of war was significantly different from the Army's, consisting of a massive attack on the Soviet Union in the event of any sort of major military action, the so-called "Sunday punch". (Note: In 1949, a Rear Admiral described the Air Force's policy as "ruthless and barbaric... random mass slaughter of men, women and children... militarily unsound... morally wrong... contrary to our fundamental ideals.) The possibility of a major war that did not escalate to the point where strategic weapons were used was a serious concern to Air Force planners. If the Soviets became convinced the U.S. would respond to tactical nuclear use in kind, and that such use would not automatically unleash SAC, they might be more willing to chance a war in Europe where they might maintain superiority.

The Air Force began to agitate against Jupiter, saying that the Army's vision of a low-scale nuclear war was destabilizing, while claiming that their own Thor missile did not represent this sort of destabilizing force as it was purely strategic. They may also have been motivated by the WSEG's comments that if the Jupiter team's accuracy claims were true, "they would indicate that Jupiter is the most promising weapon for development".

=== Army to Air Force ===
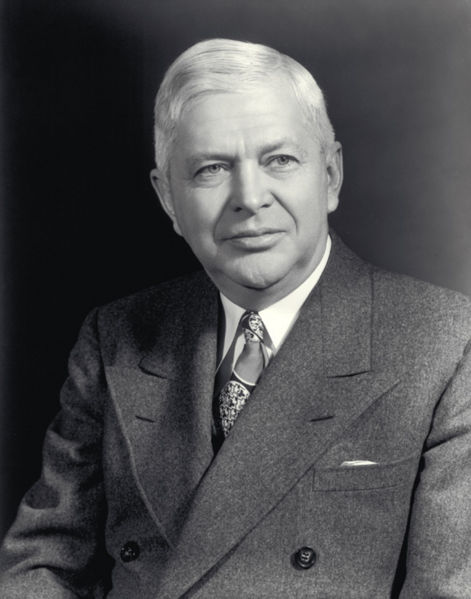
Secretary of Defense Wilson attempted to solve internecine fighting by canceling Army deployment of Jupiter; the launch of Sputnik 1 would cause many of his limitations on Army missile development to be removed.

As the Air Force's arguments against Jupiter grew more vocal, the argument came to encompass several other ongoing projects that the two forces had in common, including surface-to-air missiles and anti-ballistic missiles. By the middle of 1956, both forces were engaged in tit-for-tat attacks in the press, with the Air Force calling the Army "unfit to guard the nation" on the front page of The New York Times and sending out press releases about how bad their SAM-A-25 Nike Hercules missile was compared to the Air Force's IM-99 Bomarc.

Tired of the internecine fighting, Secretary of Defense Wilson decided to end it once and for all. Examining a wide variety of complaints between the two forces, on 18 November 1956, he published a memo that limited the Army to weapons with a range of 320 km (200 mi) or less, and those dedicated to air defense to half that. Jupiter's 2,400 km (1,500 mi) range was well over this limit, but instead of forcing them to cancel the project, Wilson had the ABMA team continue development and the Air Force to ultimately deploy it. This was precisely the plan that Schriever had rejected the year before.

The Army were apoplectic, and let the press know it. This ultimately led to the court-martial of Colonel John C. Nickerson Jr., after he leaked information about various Army projects, including the then-secret Pershing missile.

The Air Force were no happier, as they had little real interest in anything other than Atlas, and didn't see a strong need for one IRBM, let alone two. Through 1957 the situation between the Air Force and ABMA was almost nonfunctional, with ABMA requests for updates on the project going unanswered for months. The Air Force did, however, reduce the production rate from two missiles per month to one. They then began a review process with the thinly disguised goal of canceling Jupiter.

=== Army to NASA ===
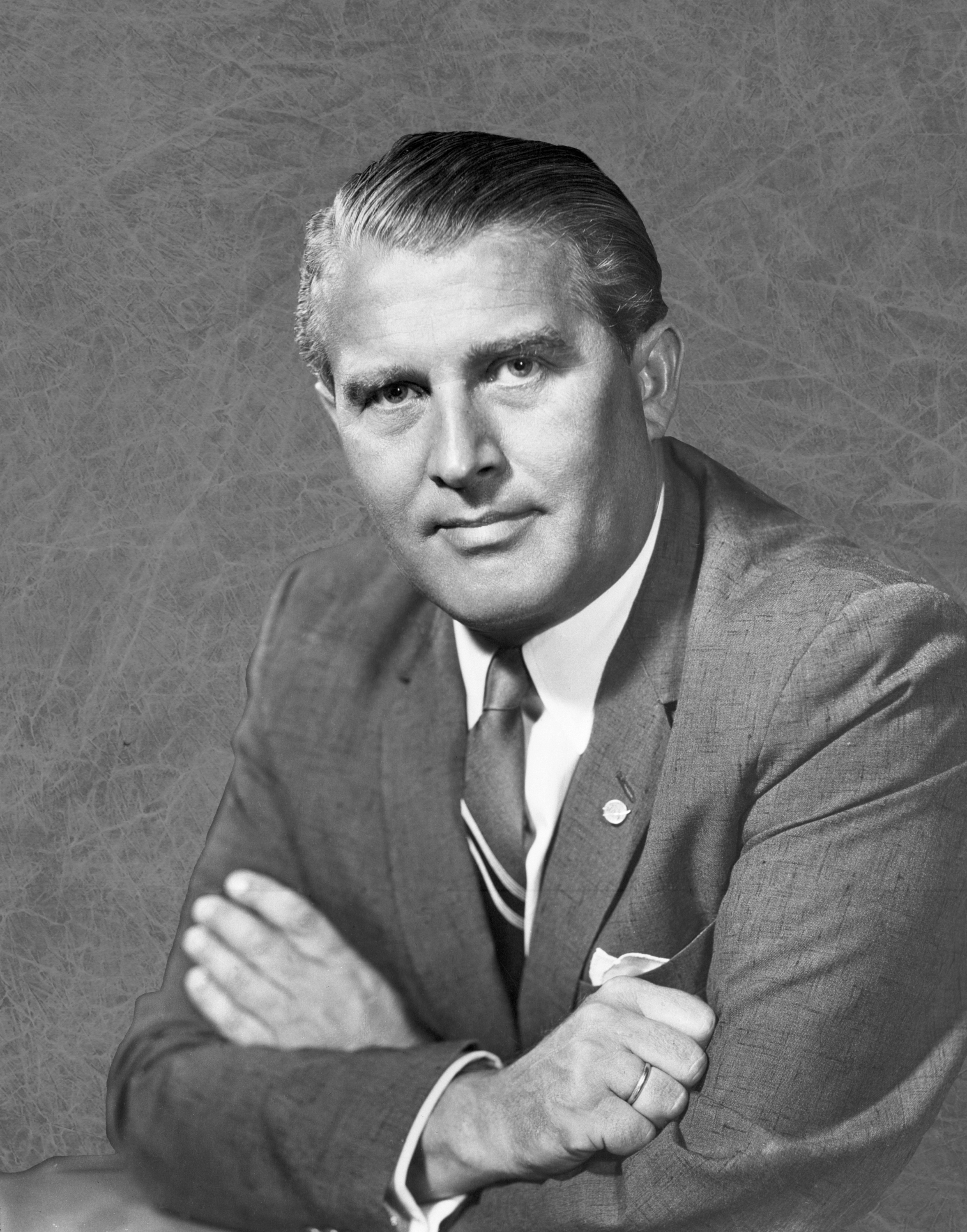
Jupiter was von Braun's last military design while at ABMA. He would later combine fuel tanks from Jupiter and Redstone to build the Saturn I.

When the Army was stripped of their long-range surface-to-surface role, the question arose as to what to do with the ABMA team. The large team built up for the Redstone and Jupiter efforts would not be needed for the short range missiles fitting the Wilson range limits, but breaking up the team was something no one wanted.

The team soon began working on non-military rockets, which did not fall under the Wilson range requirements. This led to a series of designs extending the existing Juno series, using various combinations of parts from Army and Air Force missiles to meet a wide variety of performance goals. During a visit by Advanced Research Projects Agency (ARPA), the various plans were presented, notably the Juno V concept which ABMA saw as a solution for launching the spy satellites the Air Force was designing. The Air Force was, unsurprisingly, planning to use its own launcher for this, an expanded version of the upcoming Titan II. ARPA then provided ABMA with initial funding to keep the Juno V project moving, and assigned it von Braun's preferred name of "Saturn", meaning "the one after Jupiter".

Meanwhile, President Eisenhower was interested in handing the job of space exploration to a civilian body, which would avoid any potential issues over the militarization of space. This was formed as NASA in late 1958. Some months later ABMA was handed over to NASA to become the Marshall Space Flight Center.

When the next president, John F. Kennedy, announced the goal of landing on the Moon on 25 May 1961, two competing designs were considered for the booster, Marshall's Saturn V and the NASA Nova. The subsequent selection of the smaller Saturn was a factor in the success of the Apollo project.

== Bibliography ==
- Bilstein, Roger (1996). "Stages to Saturn". NASA History Office.
- Healy, Roy (18 December 1958). Development of the Rocket Engine for the Jupiter Missile (PDF) (Technical report). Rocketdyne.
- Kyle, Ed (14 August 2011). "King of Gods: The Jupiter Missile Story". Space Launch Report.
- Mackenzie, Donald (1993). Inventing Accuracy, a Historical Sociology of Nuclear Missile Guidance. MIT Press.
- Neufeld, Jacob (1990). The development of ballistic missiles in the United States Air Force 1945–1960. DIANE Publishing. ISBN 9781428992993.
- Walker, James; Bernstein, Lewis; Lang, Sharon (2003). Seize the High Ground: The U. S. Army in Space and Missile Defense. Washington, D.C.: Center of Military History. ISBN 9780160723087. OCLC 57711369.
