= Mildred Barnes Bliss =

American art collector and philanthropist (1879–1969)

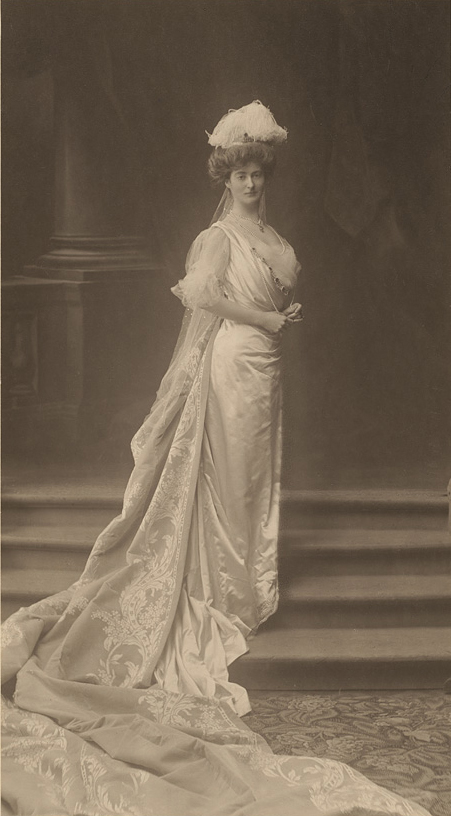
- Born: September 9, 1879; New York City, New York, U.S.
- Died: January 17, 1969 (aged 89); Washington, D.C., U.S.
- Occupations: Art collector, philanthropist
- Spouse: Robert Woods Bliss (m. 1908; died 1962)

Mildred Barnes Bliss (September 9, 1879 – January 17, 1969) was an American art collector, philanthropist, and one of the cofounders of the Dumbarton Oaks Research Library and Collection in Washington, D.C.

== Biography ==
Bliss was born in New York City on September 9, 1879, the daughter of U.S. Congressman Demas Barnes (1827–1888), and Anna Dorinda Blaksley Barnes (1851–1935). She was the half-sister of Cora (Kora) Fanny Barnes (1858–1911). When Anna Barnes remarried in 1894, Mildred Barnes became the stepdaughter of William Henry Bliss (1844-1932) and the stepsister of Robert Woods Bliss (1875–1962) and Annie Louise Bliss Warren (1878–1964).

Mildred Barnes was educated at Miss Porter's School in Farmington, Connecticut, and, reportedly, at private schools in France. She was fluent in French and was proficient in Spanish, German, and Italian. She acquired a working farm in Sharon, Connecticut, in 1898, which she sold in 1909. Mildred Barnes married her stepbrother, Robert Woods Bliss, on April 14, 1908.

Due to his diplomatic postings, they lived in Brussels (1908–1909), Buenos Aires (1909–1912), Paris (1912–1919), Washington, D.C. (1919–1923), Stockholm (1923–1927), and Buenos Aires again (1927–1933) before returning, in retirement, to Washington, D.C. (1933).

Mildred Barnes Bliss was the principal beneficiary of the estates of her half-sister, Cora Barnes, in 1911, and of her mother, Anna Barnes Bliss, in 1935. This wealth was largely based on Demas Barnes’s investments in The Centaur Company, the manufacturers of the laxative Fletcher’s Castoria, the success of which had made him a wealthy man.

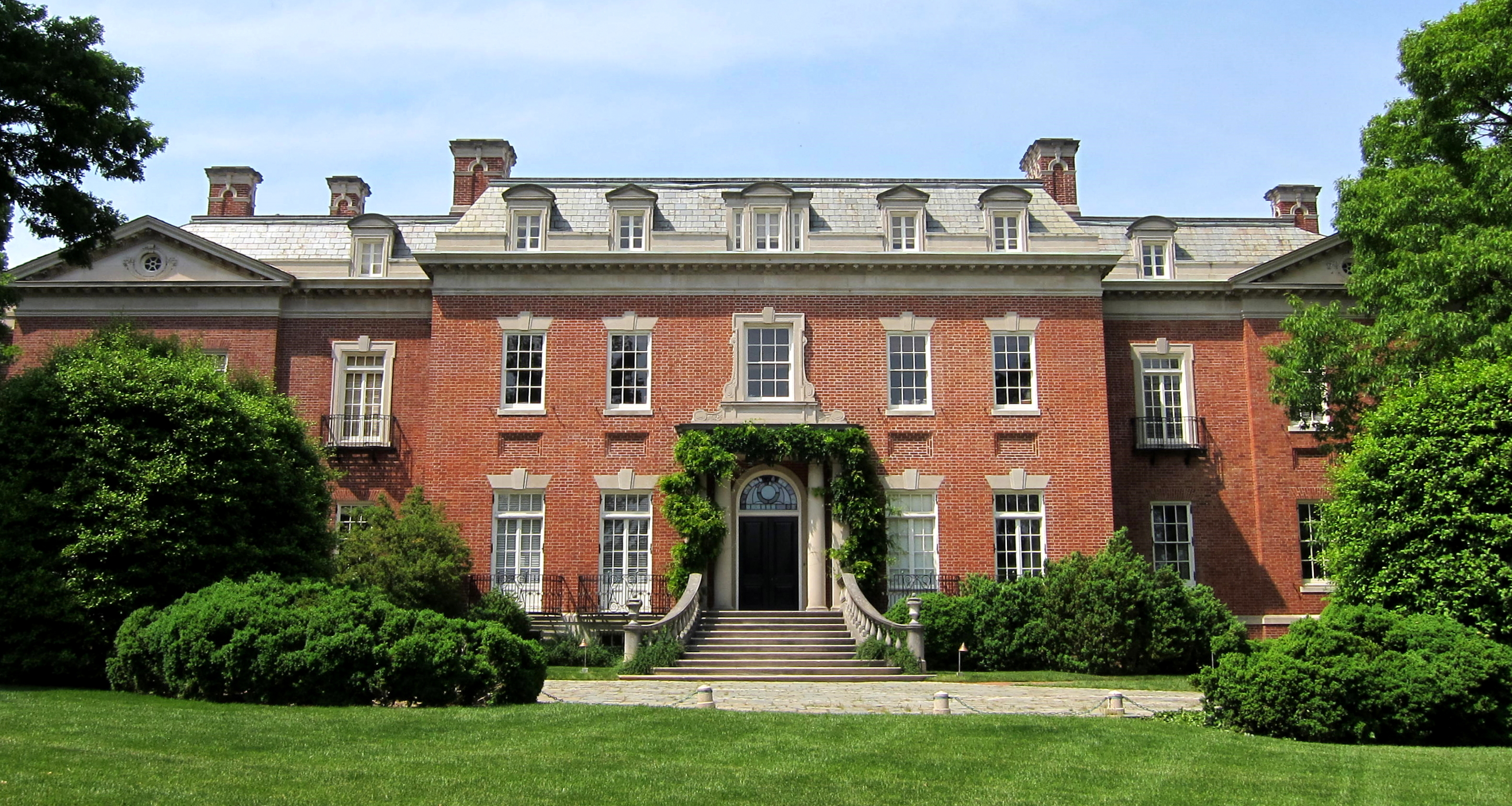
Bliss' former home, Dumbarton Oaks, in Washington, D.C.

While living in Paris (1912–1919), the Blisses became reacquainted with Mildred Bliss’s childhood friend, the American Royall Tyler (1884–1953), who was living in Paris with his wife, Elisina Palamidessi de Castelvecchio Tyler (1878–1959). Tyler introduced the Blisses to important Parisian art dealers and nurtured their growing interest as art collectors, especially of Byzantine and pre-Columbian artworks.

At the outbreak of the First World War, the Blisses helped found the American Ambulance Field Service (later the American Field Service) in France in 1914, to which they donated an entire section of 23 ambulances and three staff cars. The Blisses opened and equipped a central depot in Paris, the “Service de Distribution Américaine,” for the distribution of medical and surgical supplies and clothing.

As vice-president of the Comité Franco-Américain pour la Protection des Enfants de la Frontière, beginning in 1914 Mildred Bliss helped establish centers in France for the care of Belgian and French children orphaned or displaced during the war. When America entered the war, Mildred Bliss served as chairman of the executive board of the American Red Cross’s Woman’s War Relief Corps in France. For her work during the First World War, she was made a chevalier of the French Legion of Honor.

The Blisses purchased their home, Dumbarton Oaks, in 1920, and also maintained apartments in Paris, at 4 rue Henri Moissan, and New York City, first at 969 Park Avenue in 1922 and then at 104 East 68th Street. Mildred Bliss was elected a member of The Colonial Dames in the State of New York in 1921. In celebration of the Blisses’ thirtieth wedding anniversary, Mildred Bliss commissioned Igor Stravinsky's Dumbarton Oaks Concerto, which was premiered at Dumbarton Oaks on May 8, 1938. She served on the Board of Trustees of the Museum of Modern Art in New York. After giving Dumbarton Oaks to Harvard University in 1940, the Blisses resided at 1537 28th Street, N.W., Washington, D.C. The Blisses had no children.

Mildred Bliss died in Washington, D.C., at the age of 89 on January 17, 1969.

== Bibliography ==
The bulk of primary correspondence and other related documents are found in the Papers of Robert Woods Bliss and Mildred Barnes Bliss, ca. 1860–1969, Harvard University Archives, HUGFP76.xx. For secondary sources on the Blisses, see Susan Tamulevich, Dumbarton Oaks: Garden into Art (New York, 2001); James N. Carder, “Mildred and Robert Woods Bliss and the Dumbarton Oaks Research Library and Collection,” in Sacred Art, Secular Context, Objects of Art from the Byzantine Collection of Dumbarton Oaks, Washington, D.C., Accompanied by American Paintings from the Collection of Mildred and Robert Woods Bliss, Asen Kirin, ed. with contributions by James N. Carder and Robert S. Nelson (Athens, GA, 2005), 22–37; and James N. Carder, “Mildred and Robert Woods Bliss, A Brief Biography,” in A Home of the Humanities: The Collecting and Patronage of Mildred and Robert Woods Bliss, James N. Carder, ed. (Washington, D.C., 2010), 1–25.
