= Mary E. Eato =

African-American suffragist and teacher

Mary Eato
- Born: Mary Elizabeth Eato; September 23, 1844; New York City, New York, U.S
- Died: February 8, 1915 (aged 70)
- Other names: Mary E. Eaton
- Occupations: Educator, suffragist

Mary Elizabeth Eato (also Eaton; September 23, 1844 – February 8, 1915) was an African-American suffragist and teacher.

== Life ==
Eato was born in New York City on September 23, 1844, the daughter of Timothy and Sarah Jane Eato.

At the age of 16, Eato began teaching for the "Colored Schools". She received a diploma in teaching from a New York normal school in July 1861, when she was the only colored student graduating at the commencement ceremony. She later went on to teach at Grammar Schools. Among the schools she taught at were Grammar School No. 3, 41st Street, under the principal Charles Lewis Reason, and Grammar School No. 80, on 42nd Street.

In 1891, she was awarded the degree of Master of Pedagogy from the University of the City of New York. She taught for 44 years, retiring in 1904. Among her students were some who themselves became teachers, such as Frances Reynolds Keyser, and Dr. Adena C. E. Minott, founder of a school of mental sciences in Chicago.

During her teaching career, she met Sarah Garnet, the first black woman principal in New York City. While Garnet founded the Colored Women's Equal Suffrage League of Brooklyn, Eato held a membership there for many years. Eato then became the league's vice president in 1908.

She died on February 8, 1915, at the age of 70.

== See also ==
- Sarah Garnet
- Equal Suffrage League
