= Fordham Leadership Academy for Business and Technology =

Public school in New York City

Fordham Leadership Academy

Location
- 500 East Fordham Road; The Bronx, New York, New York; United States
- Coordinates: 40°51′34″N 73°53′19″W

Information
- Type: Public secondary
- School district: 10
- Principal: Fiorella Cabrejos
- Grades: 9-12
- Enrollment: 438

Fordham Leadership Academy (FLA), mostly called Fordham Leadership, is a small school located within Roosevelt Educational Campus, across the street from Fordham University. Core Values

FLA’s core values result from our collective efforts to strengthen student ownership and commitment to education, pride in their community, and college/career readiness for post-high school opportunities. Students at FLA will have acquired each of the core values via a Leadership Commitment (chosen from a menu of options) by the time they graduate. Each core value is a leadership quality all FLA students are expected to exhibit and is supported by all faculty and staff.
