= The Centaur Company =

- Industry: Pharmeceutical
- Founded: 1871
- Founder: Charles Henry Fletcher
- Products: Fletcher's Castoria, Centaur Liniment

The Centaur Company, founded in 1871, owned and marketed proprietary medicines, notably, the stimulant laxative Fletcher's Castoria and the ointment Centaur Liniment. The company is historically significant in that it was a driving force during the early development of mass marketing and advertising.

== History ==
In 1871, The Centaur Company was formed by Charles Henry Fletcher at 80 Varick Street, New York City to purchase the rights to and manufacture the laxative Pitcher's Castoria, renamed Fletcher's Castoria after the founder. Together with Demas Barnes and Joseph B. Rose who had purchased the formula for Centaur Liniment that same year, manufacturing began.

In 1923 Sterling Drug purchased a 1/4 interest in The Centaur Company and eventually purchased the entire company.

In 1934, the Centaur Company Division of Sterling Products (later called Sterling Drug) purchased Z.B.T. products from the Crystal Corporation.

In 1984, Sterling Drug sold Centaur's raison d'être product, Fletcher's Castoria, to Mentholatum Co Inc.

The Centaur-Caldwell division of Sterling Drug also owned the marketing rights to Dr. William B. Caldwell's "Syrup Pepsin", manufactured in Monticello, Illinois, until the factory closed in 1985.

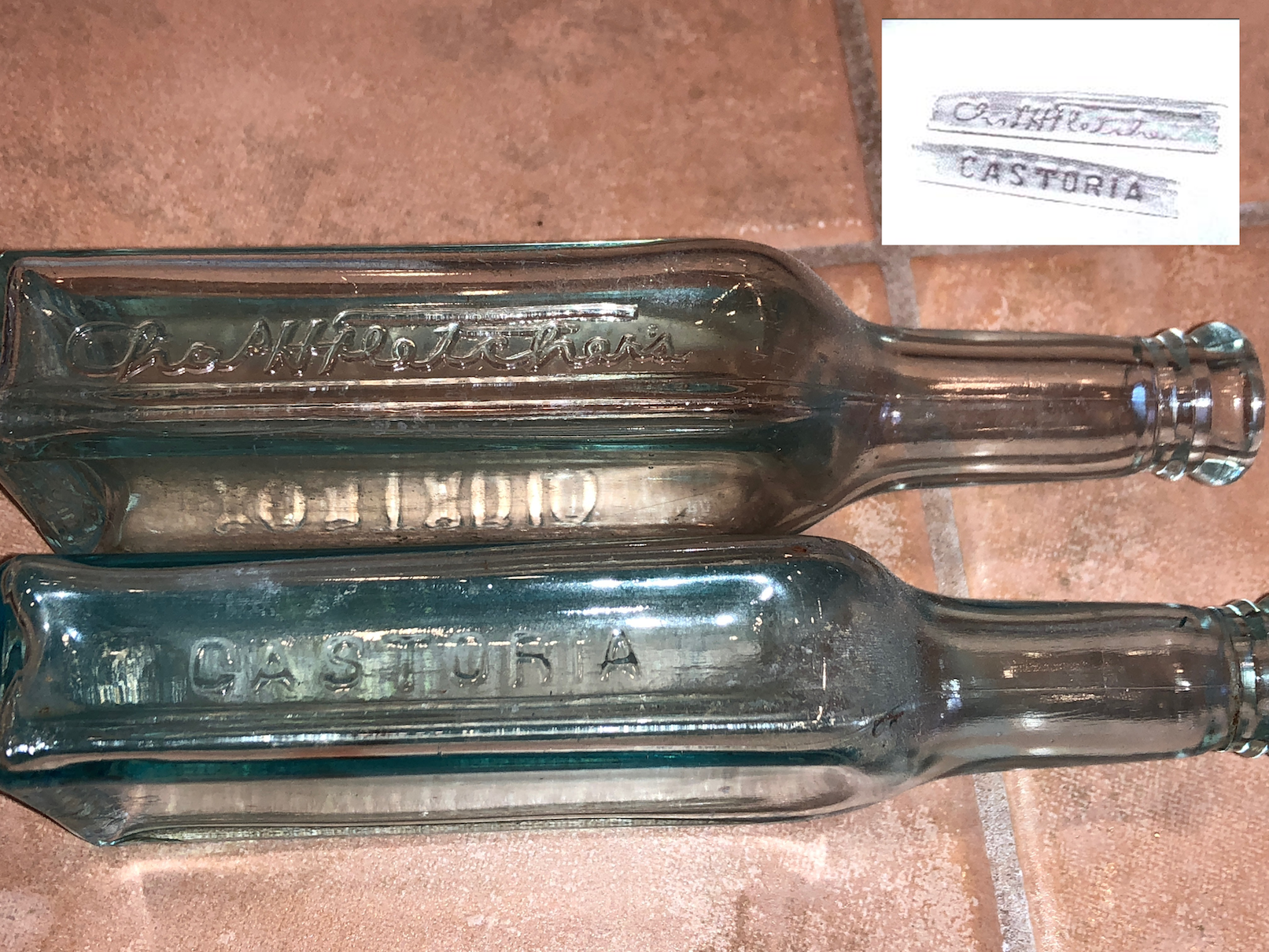
Two Fletcher's Castoria Bottles, plus rubbings of the signature and product name.

== Advertising ==
In the 1870s, The Centaur Company began doing significant advertising to create its brands, with a primary emphasis on Castoria. Between 1870 and World War II "Children cry for Chas. H. Fletcher's Castoria" was one of the best known advertising slogans. At the opening of the Brooklyn Bridge in 1883, Chas. H. Fletcher painted advertisements on virtually every blank wall in sight; they are quite visible in images of the opening of the bridge. Castoria ads from the 1870s through 1920s are still visible today on the buildings of New York.

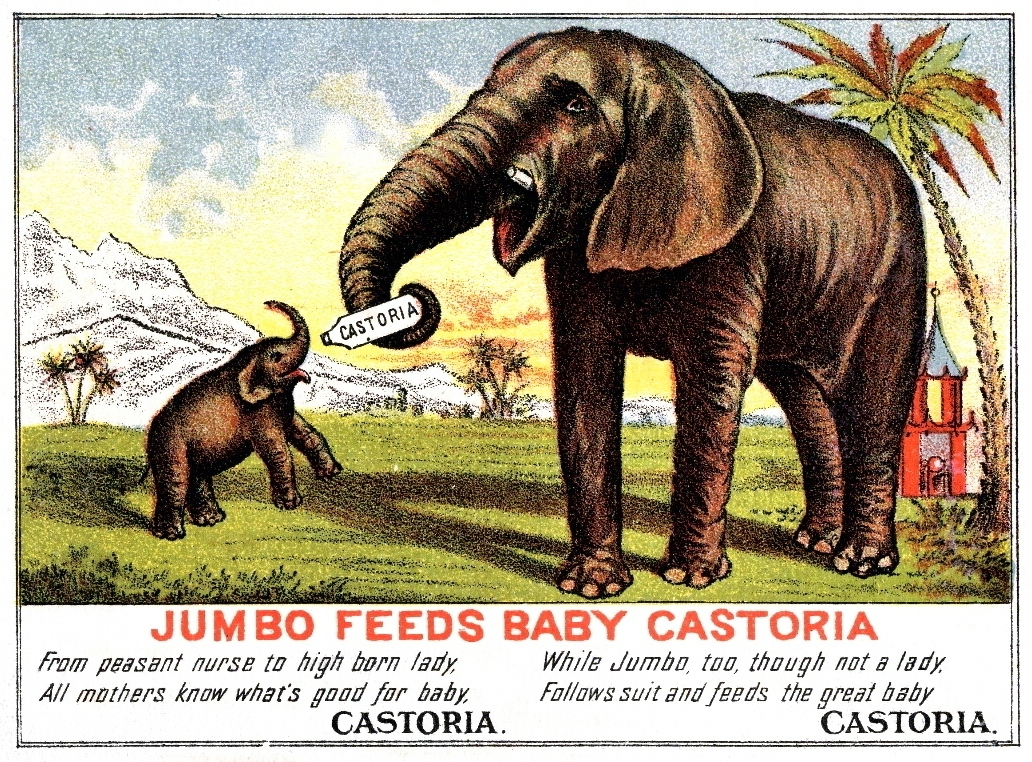
Advertisement featuring Jumbo

Centaur was an early practitioner of the use of celebrities in mass advertising. Centaur Liniment advertising included a purported endorsement from P.T. Barnum. One famous ad had the company represented by Barnum's famous circus star Jumbo, the giant elephant. Another ad featured the legendary boxer Joe Louis.

In the 1920s, Centaur was one of the earliest advertisers targeting women directly. "Their advertising prior to that had targeted both men and women, but here [in the 1920s] they began to advertise additionally in the new publications specifically targeted to women."

There were three "Fletcher's Castoria" B-17 Flying Fortress bombers during World War II, part of the 100th Bomber Group. The first was lost, but the crew survived. The second survived the war. Its pilot was William H. Fletcher, hence its name although the pilot was not a descendant of Charles Henry Fletcher.
