= Concerto in E-flat "Dumbarton Oaks" =

Composition by Igor Stravinsky

Concerto in E♭
- Dumbarton Oaks, 8.v.38
- Chamber concerto by Igor Stravinsky
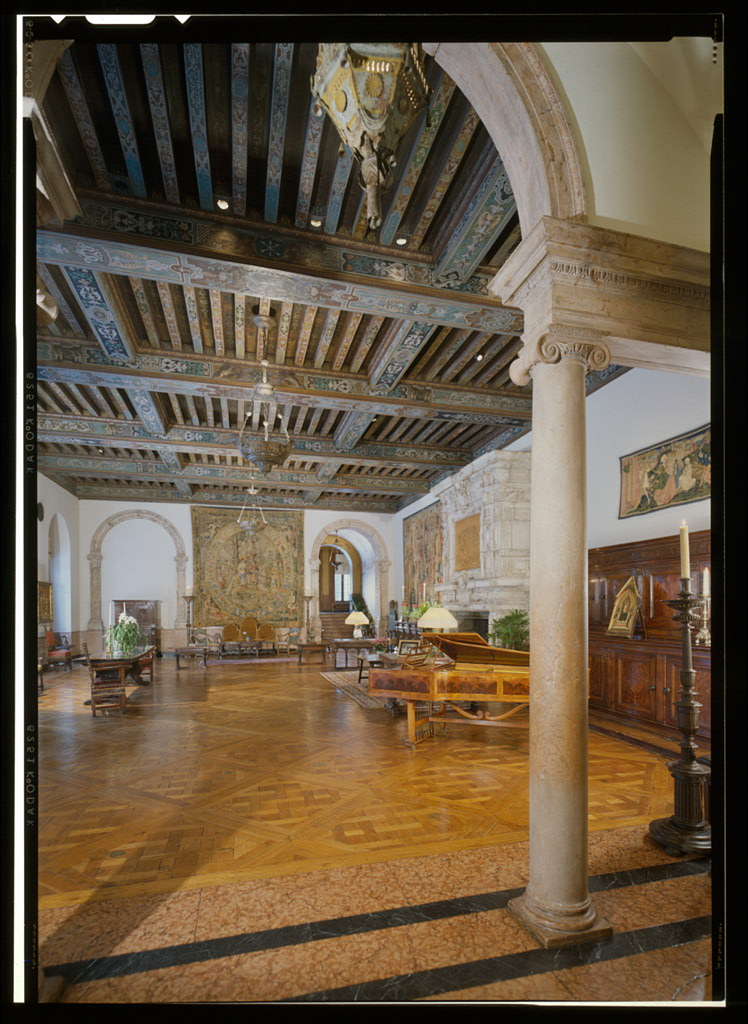
- Music room at Dumbarton Oaks
- Key: E♭ major
- Composed: 1937–38
- Dedication: Robert Woods Bliss and Mildred Barnes Bliss
- Performed: May 8, 1938: Dumbarton Oaks
- Movements: three
- Scoring: chamber orchestra

Concerto in E♭, inscribed Dumbarton Oaks, 8.v.38 (1937–38) is a chamber concerto by Igor Stravinsky, named for the Dumbarton Oaks estate of Robert Woods Bliss and Mildred Barnes Bliss in Washington, D.C., who commissioned it for their thirtieth wedding anniversary.

The commission had been brokered by Nadia Boulanger. She also conducted the May 8, 1938, private premiere in the music room at Dumbarton Oaks, while the composer was hospitalized with tuberculosis. The public premiere took place in Paris on June 4, 1938, at a concert of La Sérénade, with Stravinsky conducting.

The full-score manuscript, formerly owned by Mr. and Mrs. Robert Woods Bliss, is in the Harvard University Rare Book Collection of the Dumbarton Oaks Research Library, Washington, D.C.

== Music ==
Composed in Stravinsky's neoclassical period, the piece is one of Stravinsky's two chamber concertos (the other being the Concerto in D, for strings, 1946). It is scored for a chamber orchestra of flute, B♭ clarinet, bassoon, two horns, three violins, three violas, two cellos, and two double basses.

The three movements are:

1. Tempo giusto
2. Allegretto
3. Con moto

They are performed without a break, totaling roughly 12 minutes.

The concerto was heavily inspired by J.S. Bach's set of Brandenburg Concertos, and was the last work Stravinsky completed in Europe, started in spring 1937 at the Château de Montoux near Annemasse, near Geneva, Switzerland, and finished in Paris on March 29, 1938.

== Adaptations ==
Stravinsky himself created a reduction for two pianos. Leif Thybo's 1952 transcription for organ laid the foundation for his investigation of the possibilities of the modern form of the instrument. A ballet, choreographed by Jerome Robbins, was premiered by the New York City Ballet on June 23, 1972, calling for one principal and six corps dancers of each sex.

The score was arranged for marimba and tuba by Peter Welsh, and performed in Philadelphia in 1993.

== Sources ==
Sources

- Anon. n.d. "Repertory Index: Dumbarton Oaks". Robbins Rights Trust website (archive from 19 April 2016, accessed 9 February 2018).
- Benton, Rita (2001). "Libraries". Grove Music Online (8th ed.). Oxford University Press. doi:10.1093/gmo/9781561592630.article.40070. ISBN 978-1-56159-263-0. (subscription, Wikilibrary access, or UK public library membership required)
- Brooks, Jeanice. 2010. "Collecting Past and Present: Music History and Musical Performance at Dumbarton Oaks." In A Home of the Humanities: The Collecting and Patronage of Mildred and Robert Woods Bliss, ed. James N. Carder, pp. 74–91. Washington D.C.: Dumbarton Oaks.
- Jakobsen, Erik H. A. (2001). "Thybo, Leif". Grove Music Online (8th ed.). Oxford University Press. doi:10.1093/gmo/9781561592630.article.27922. ISBN 978-1-56159-263-0. (subscription, Wikilibrary access, or UK public library membership required)
- Walsh, Stephen (2001). "Stravinsky, Igor". Grove Music Online (8th ed.). Oxford University Press. doi:10.1093/gmo/9781561592630.article.52818. ISBN 978-1-56159-263-0. (subscription, Wikilibrary access, or UK public library membership required)
- White, Eric Walter. 1979. Stravinsky: The Composer and His Works, 2nd edition. Berkeley and Los Angeles: University of California Press. ISBN 0-520-03985-8.
