= Royall Tyler (historian) =

American historian (1884–1953)

Royall Tyler (May 4, 1884 – March 2, 1953), was an American historian, who was a descendant of the American jurist and playwright Royall Tyler. He was born in Quincy, Massachusetts, and educated at Harrow School in England. After a time at New College, Oxford, he moved to the University of Salamanca, where he became a friend of Miguel de Unamuno. In 1909 he published Spain, a Study of her Life and Arts, the first work in English to recognize the genius of El Greco. Appointed by the British government to edit the Calendar of State Papers related to negotiations between England and Spain in the time of Charles V, Holy Roman Emperor, he published the first of the five volumes of these papers in 1913; the last, completed just before his death, appeared in 1954.

During World War I he served as an officer in the US Army, where he was an interrogator of German prisoners of war. In 1919 he joined the US delegation to the Paris Peace Conference, and in 1924 the League of Nations appointed him Financial Advisor to the government of Hungary. With Hayford Peirce (the older brother of the painter Waldo Peirce) he published in French a pioneering study of Byzantine art, and he died just after completing his posthumously published biography, The Emperor Charles the Fifth.

Tyler also helped to inspire and shape the major collections of Byzantine art brought together by Robert Woods Bliss and Mildred Barnes Bliss and housed at Dumbarton Oaks in Washington, DC.

He spent most of World War II in Geneva, Switzerland, where he drew on his high-level, Europe-wide connections to perform vital work for the US intelligence network run by Allen Welsh Dulles. He spent his last years in Paris, first with the International Bank for Reconstruction and Development, then as European Representative of the National Committee for a Free Europe.

== Works ==
- Tyler, Royall (1909). Spain, a Study of Her Life and Arts. G. Richards.
- Tyler, Royall (1956). The Emperor Charles the Fifth. Essential Books. ISBN 978-0-598-49464-1.
