= Fordham High School for the Arts =

Public school in New York City

Coordinates: 40°51′34″N 73°53′19″W

Fordham Arts

Location
- 500 East Fordham Road; The Bronx, New York, New York, USA

Information
- Type: Public secondary
- NCES School ID: 360008705183
- Principal: Michael Johnson Jr.
- Faculty: 34.7 FTEs
- Grades: 9-12
- Enrollment: 394 (as of 2022–23)
- Student to teacher ratio: 11.3:1

Fordham High School for the Arts, often called simply Fordham Arts, is a small school located within Roosevelt Educational Campus, the site of the former Theodore Roosevelt High School, across the street from Fordham University. It was established in 2002 and is part of the New York City Department of Education. Fordham High School for the Arts is a 2024 National Blue Ribbon School. The U.S. Department of Education honored the school in the Exemplary High Performing High School category.

FHSA specializes in the arts, with a curriculum that emphasizes dance, music, theater, and visual arts. In addition to traditional academic classes, FHSA offers a variety of arts classes. Dance classes include ballet, modern dance, and jazz, while music classes include chorus, band, and orchestra. Theater classes cover acting, stagecraft, and playwriting, and visual arts classes include drawing, painting, and sculpture.

As of the 2022–23 school year, the school had an enrollment of 394 students and 34.7 classroom teachers (on an FTE basis), for a student–teacher ratio of 11.3:1. There were 304 students (77.2% of enrollment) eligible for free lunch and 27 (6.9% of students) eligible for reduced-cost lunch.

Notable alumni include Samara Joy Alfredo Colon.
