= Charles Henry Fletcher =

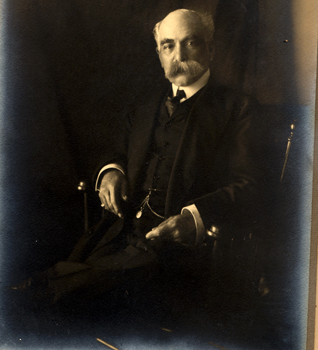
Charles Henry Fletcher

Charles Henry Fletcher (aka Chas. H. Fletcher in company advertising) organized and led the Centaur Company, makers of "Fletcher's Castoria", serving as president and general manager.

== Early life and Business career ==
He was born December 25, 1837 (according to most records) to father Charles Fletcher, in New York City, New York.

As a boy of 13, Fletcher went to work for a proprietary medicine company. In 1872 he managed to save enough to buy from a physician, Dr. Samuel Pitcher, the formula of a laxative called Castoria. With this formula, he made a fortune.

Originally marketed as Pitcher's Castoria, the product has had several names, notably Fletcher's own.

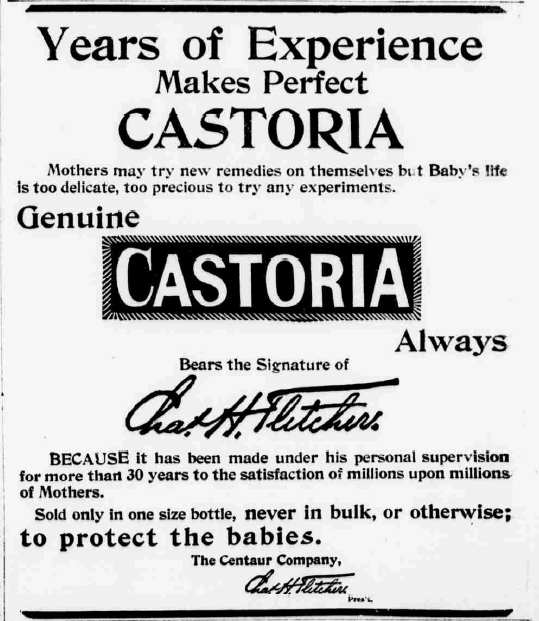
Castoria Laxative advertisement, c. 1914

A little known fact is that he was sent south before the Civil War to collect debts by Demas Barnes. He returned (successfully) just before Fort Sumter was attacked (so shortly before April 12, 1861, he returned north). Partly due to this success (and others both before and after), Barnes backed him in forming the Centaur Company.

=== Testimonials ===
"[The Centaur Company is] probably the largest proprietary medicine concern in the country, if not in the world. Mr. Fletcher's name has become so identified with the product of the company that it is known all over the civilized world."

"Charles H. Fletcher['s] ... signature is perhaps better known than that of any other man of his day. ... The [Centaur] company's advertising is said to have created a new epoch in advertising, and among the famous slogans which made it world-known was 'Babies cry for it',"

== Personal life ==
He married Jemima Elizabeth Bright (September 10, 1848, England - May 8, 1932, Manhattan, New York) in 1866 (according to 1890 census records). He had three daughters who lived to adulthood, Mymie (My-me) (May 16, 1868, in Brooklyn, New York - May 28, 1958, in Pasadena, California) who married the Reverend William Morrison (October 5, 1863 - January 4, 1915) who was the priest at Trinity Church in New York City, Lucille (December 16, 1873, in Brooklyn, New York - February 29, 1956, in East Orange, New Jersey) who married George Howard Betts (August 5, 1871, Brooklyn, New York - 8 Jul 1940 in Pinehurst, North Carolina) who was a cosmetics manufacturer, Ettye (Et-E) (November 25, 1870, in Brooklyn, New York - December 7, 1929, in Orange, New Jersey) who married Albert Bryant also had large roles in the Centaur Company and Sterling Products later known Sterling Drug. Albert Bryant's sister, Sara Cone Bryant, was a well-known children's book author. Records indicated he had one daughter, Eva born about 1869 who died young and another child who is believed to have died at birth and was unnamed.

Per his will, he had three half-sisters, Catherine Gale Fletcher, Fanny Fletcher and Lucille Bennett. His house still stands and is privately owned on Berkeley Avenue in Orange, New Jersey. The house has seven full bathrooms.

Charles Henry Fletcher died April 9, 1922, in Orange, New Jersey. He was interred in Green-Wood Cemetery, Brooklyn, New York.

== Related facts ==
- In 1884, the Centaur Company offered to pay for the pedestal for the Statue of Liberty when the Pedestal Fund Committee found itself short of money in return for placing "Castoria" on the base for one year. The offer was declined.
- Demas Barnes, a United States representative from New York, was one of the initial backers of Fletcher's Castoria and his daughter Mildred Barnes Bliss used portions of their share to build Dumbarton Oaks, in Georgetown, DC.
- Charles Henry Fletcher's son-in-law Albert Bryant began working for the Centaur Company (and later Sterling Products) in 1899 and retired from the company November 8, 1937.
- In July 1908 he received from Charles L. Seabury Company the "largest yacht in the world driven by motor power" at the time, the Jemima F. III which was approximately 111 feet in length, named for his wife, Jemima, a trend for large luxury yachts that continues.
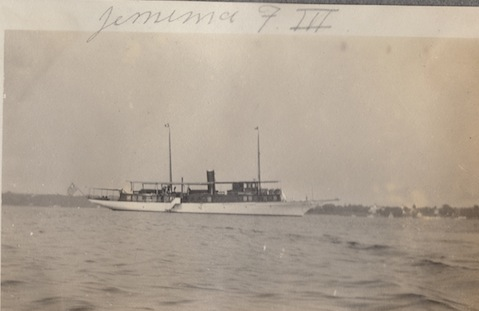
Jemima F. III
