= Bronx High School for Law and Community Service =

Public school in New York City

Coordinates: 40°51′34″N 73°53′18″W

Bronx Law and Community Service

Location
- 500 East Fordham Road; Bronx, NY; USA

Information
- Type: Public secondary
- Principal: Michael Barakat
- Faculty: 25.8 FTEs
- Grades: 9-12
- Enrollment: 416 (as of 2014-15)
- Student to teacher ratio: 16.1:1
- Colors: Green and White
- Mascot: Eagle

Bronx High School for Law and Community Service is a small school in the New York City borough of The Bronx. It is located within Roosevelt Educational Campus, across the street from Fordham University.

As of the 2014–15 school year, the school had an enrollment of 416 students and 25.8 classroom teachers (on an FTE basis), for a student–teacher ratio of 16.1:1. There were 357 students (85.8% of enrollment) eligible for free lunch and 18 (4.3% of students) eligible for reduced-cost lunch.
