= West Bronx Academy for the Future =

Public school in New York City

West Bronx

Location
- 500 East Fordham Road; The Bronx, New York, New York, USA
- Coordinates: 40°51′34″N 73°53′19″W

Information
- Type: Public secondary
- Established: 2004
- Faculty: Principal: Wilper Morales
- Grades: 6-12
- Enrollment: approx. 560
- Colors: Black, Grey, White
- Mascot: Panther
- Website: http://www.westbronxacademy.org

West Bronx Academy for the Future is a small school located within Roosevelt Educational Campus, across the street from Fordham University.
