= Sterling-Winthrop Research Centre =

- Location within Northumberland
- Former names: Alnwick Research Center, Sanofi Alnwick

General information
- Type: Pharmaceutical Research Centre
- Location: Northumberland, NE66 2JH
- Coordinates: 55.40°N 1.70°W
- Elevation: 65 m (213 ft)
- Client: Sterling-Winthrop

The Sterling-Winthrop Research Centre was a research centre in Alnwick.

== History ==
It was also known as the Alnwick Research Center. It was part of the Sterling Research Group, owned by Sterling Drug. It was taken over by Sanofi-Aventis, run by Sanofi R&D.

Former research took place at the Winthrop Laboratories site near the current Fawdon Metro station, which became Sanofi, on Edgefield Avenue in Fawdon; this site made Panadol and Solpadeine.

In 1978 the company wanted to open a research site at Dukes House in Hexham, on a site of 38 acres, north of the building. Two sites at Cramlington and Alnwick were looked at by Northumberland County Council. There were protests by a local anti-vivisection group, but sixth formers from the Duke's County Grammar School were at the meeting to support the new research centre, in March 1979. The job situation in Alnwick, at the time, was not prosperous.

The company chose the Alnwick site in July 1979. It would cost around £6m. and construction would start by the end of the year. The director of research was Alastair Ross. Construction started on 1 September 1980, being built by Rush & Tompkins, and it would cost £8m. Alnwick District Council contributed around £300,000 to the site, with the associated infrastructure needed.

It opened in April 1982, costing £11m, with 35 acres, and 130,000 sq ft of buildings. The second phase would open later in the year, with 200 people.

== Operation ==
The site looked at medical safety and toxicology. Sterling Winthrop in UK had its headquarters at Sterling Winthrop House on St Margaret's Hill, in Surbiton. In June 1994, Sanofi bought Sterling Winthrop in the UK for £1.1bn from Eastman Kodak.

On Monday 29 August 1994, SmithKline Beecham bought out Sterling Winthrop in the US for £1.9bn

=== Manufacturing ===
Sterling had manufacturing plant at Dudley, Tyne and Wear, south of Cramlington, from 1969, a management-buyout from 2016.

=== Closure ===
The site was near a Homebase and Argos. The site was put up for sale by Sanofi-Aventis in 2009.

== Structure ==
It was sited off the A1068 near the junction with the A1, in the south of Alnwick.
