= Adena C. E. Minott =

Jamaican-born American educator (c. 1879–1955)

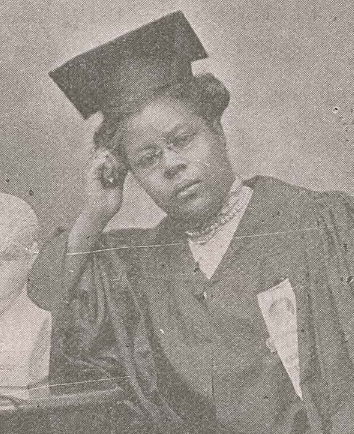
- Adena C. E. Minott, from a 1911 newspaper
- Born: about 1879; Jamaica
- Died: April 13, 1955; New York, New York, US
- Other names: A. C. E. Minott, Adena Minott-Hinds
- Education: McDonnall College of Phrenology and Psychology, Fowler and Wells Institute of Phrenology and Anthropology, College of Metaphysics
- Occupations: Educator, writer, editor and consultant
- Employer(s): Clio School of Mental Sciences, The Community Messenger
- Organization: Northeastern Federation of Colored Women's Clubs
- Notable work: How to be Beautiful and Keep Youthful (1923)

Adena Clothilda Eugenie Minott (born about 1879 – April 13, 1955) was a Jamaican-born American educator, writer, editor and consultant. She was the only Black woman to be a fellow of the American Institute of Phrenology.

== Early life and education ==
Minott was born in Allmantown, Jamaica, the daughter of John Thomas Minott and Leonora Green Minott. She moved to the United States as a child, and was educated in New York City, where suffragist Mary E. Eato was one of her teachers. One of her brothers was Harlem real estate broker J. Anthony Minott (1886–1922).

Minott earned a bachelor's and a master's degree from the McDonnall College of Phrenology and Psychology in Washington in 1899. with further studies at the Fowler and Wells Institute of Phrenology and Anthropology in New York until 1903. In 1921, she was awarded a Doctor of Metaphysics degree from the College of Metaphysics in St. Louis.

== Career ==
In 1906, Minott was founder and principal of the Clio School of Mental Sciences in New York, promising "a thorough and practical course of instruction ... in phrenology, physiognomy, psychology and kindred subjects". Frances Reynolds Keyser and Addie Waites Hunton served on the school's advisory board. From 1917 to 1922, she also ran a branch of her school in Chicago. She was the only Black woman to be a fellow of the American Institute of Phrenology. Her work was published in The Phrenological Journal and Science of Health, and The Colored American Magazine.

Minott did anti-lynching work with the Northeastern Federation of Colored Women's Clubs. In 1911, she hosted a fundraiser for Harriet Tubman's care, and for the work of the YWCA. When she bought "one of the finest houses in the block" in Harlem in 1911, as housing for her students, white property owners tried to pressure her and other Black business owners to leave. She was charged with fortune telling, but the charges were dropped. She sued The New York Times for mischaracterizing her work and her clientele in coverage of the situation.

Minott wrote and sold a book, How to be Beautiful and Keep Youthful (1923). She had a private practice consulting on metaphysics, efficiency, and character analysis. In 1932, the Clio Welfare and Community Center opened a playground in Harlem. Beginning in 1937, she edited and published a magazine, The Community Messenger, with an advisory board of Harlem Renaissance lights including Adam Clayton Powell Jr. and Thelma Berlack Boozer.

== Personal life ==
Adena Minott married businessman Harold McDonald Hinds, a widower with two daughters, in 1932. She was widowed when Harold Hinds died in 1945.
