= Sarah Smith Garnet Elementary School =

Coordinates: 40.678539°N 73.966355°W

P.S. 9 The Sarah Smith Garnet School

Location
- 80 Underhill Avenue; Brooklyn, New York; United States

Information
- Type: Public Elementary School
- Principal: Sha-Wonda Williams-Credle
- Faculty: 75
- Grades: Pre-K to 5
- Mascot: Bee
- Website: http://www.ps9brooklyn.org/

P.S. 9 The Sarah Smith Garnet School is a public elementary school of the New York City Department of Education, located in the Prospect Heights neighborhood of Brooklyn, New York City. The school was previously named "Teunis G. Bergen." It was renamed in 2019 to honor Sarah Smith Garnet, a suffragist and the first African-American, female principal of a New York City public school.

Famous alumni include the classical composer Aaron Copland, who was an honor student in 1914.

== Courses ==
P.S. 9 includes a variety of enrichment activities, including art, singing, technology, music and much more.
