= Theodore Roosevelt High School (New York City) =

Public school in New York City

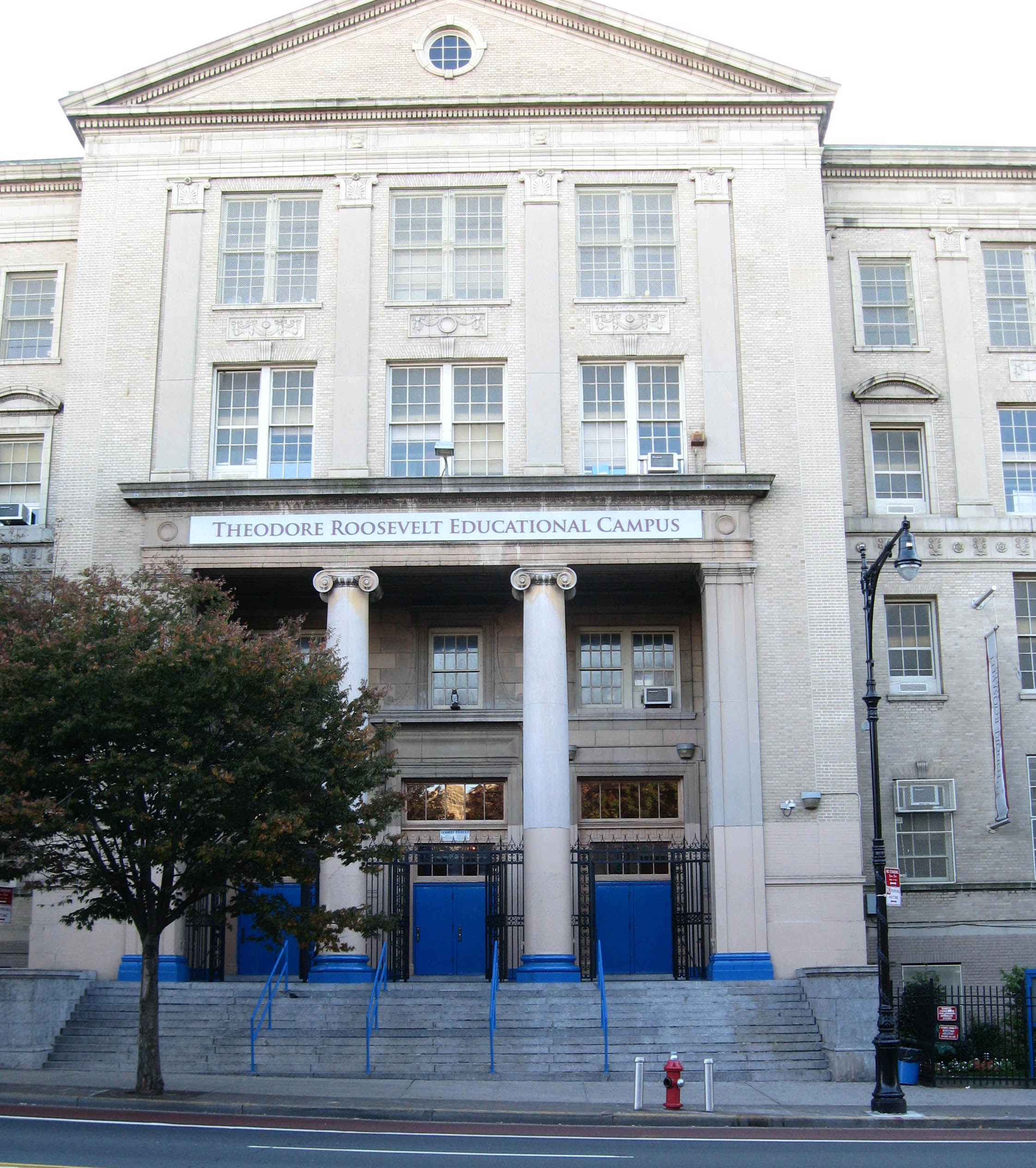

Location
- 500 East Fordham Road; Belmont; The Bronx, NY 10458; United States; 40°51′34″N 73°53′19″W

Information
- Former name: Roosevelt High School
- School type: Public high school
- Opened: November 14, 1918 (school); September 1928 (building)
- Status: closed
- Closed: 2006
- School board: New York City Panel for Educational Policy
- School district: New York City Department of Education
- Grades: 9–12
- Team name: Rough Riders

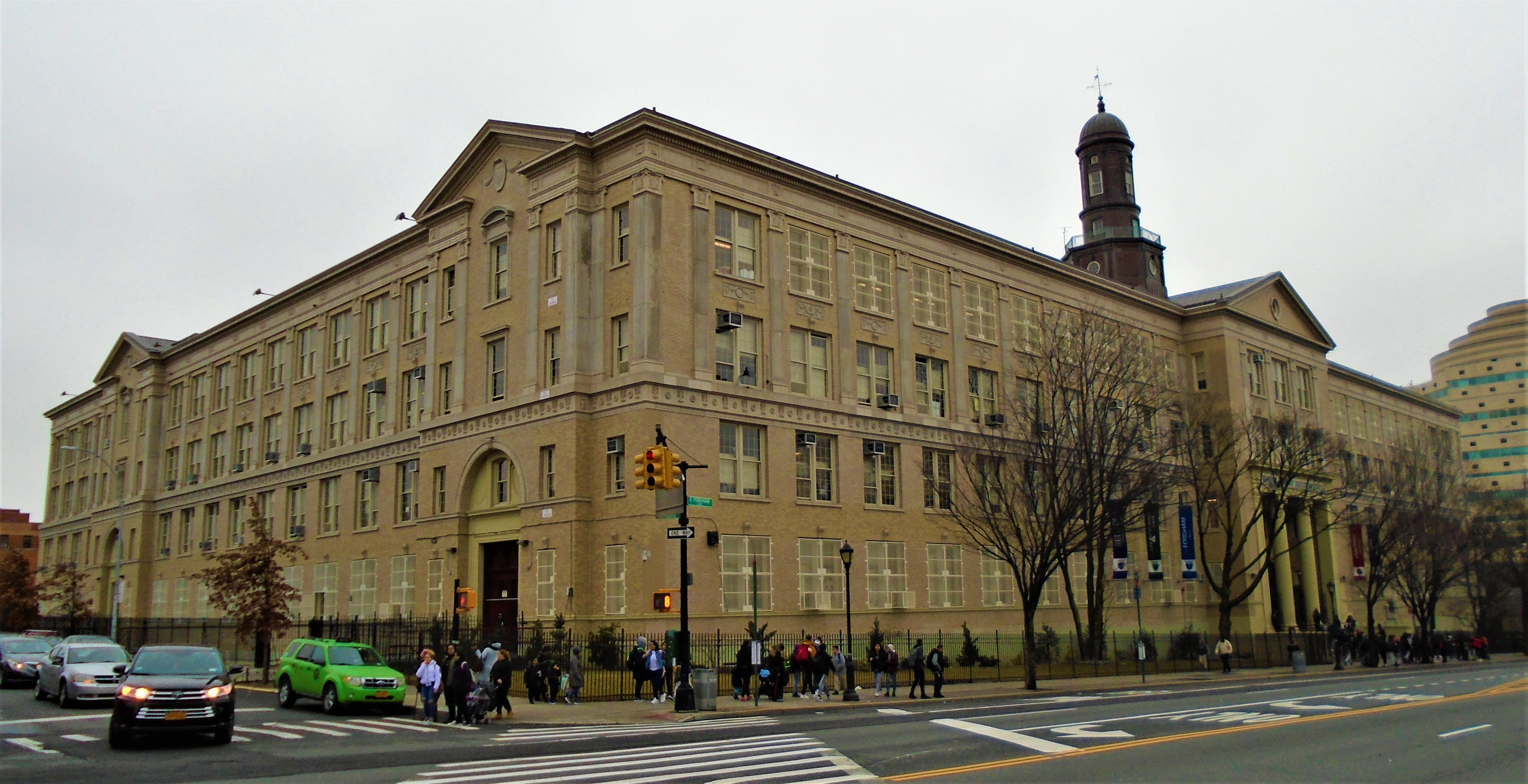
Theodore Roosevelt Educational Campus in February 2020

Theodore Roosevelt High School, originally Roosevelt High School, the third public high school to open in the Bronx, New York, operated from 1918 until its permanent closure in 2006. Shutting down incrementally since 2002, this large high school, initially enrolling about 4 000 students, yearly dwindled, newly sharing its 1928 building with new, small public high schools—all pooling students for major, extracurricular activities like athletics and JROTC—a reorganization renaming the building Theodore Roosevelt Educational Campus, still open after the historic, namesake high school ceased in 2006. At its November 1918 opening, Roosevelt High School operated in the building of school PS 31.

At the January 1919 death of the Roosevelt family's preeminent member, a recent US president and venerated statesman, Roosevelt High School was renamed. And as the Bronx led New York City's population growth, its enrollment snowballed. Still focusing on accounting and secretarial skills, Roosevelt gained more classrooms in other schools' buildings. Yet in 1928, the high school entered its own, newly built at 500 East Fordham Road, making it one of America's high schools largest and best equipped. At the northern edge of the Belmont section, soon a Little Italy, and the southern edge of Fordham University's campus, Roosevelt's building became a community venue for organizations' meetings and politicians' speeches.

The school colors were red and white. The sports teams were the Rough Riders, nickname of the cavalry unit led by Colonel Roosevelt before his US presidency. The high school's 1930s and 1940s students participated extracurricularly at about 55% or New York City's lowest rate, about 80% citywide. Still, Roosevelt was esteemed in its own niche, educating for the basic workforce, the school's image enduring into the 1950s. Meanwhile, a local gang, the Fordham Baldies, menacing blacks and Hispanics in Roosevelt's vicinity, kept enrollment overwhelmingly white. In the 1960s, among students citywide, truancy increased and socializing gained priority, whereby other high schools often issued diplomas once their requirements were met via Roosevelt's evening and summer classes.

Across the 1960s, amid economic stagflation, drug selling popularized, common at Roosevelt by 1970. As drug culture had eased racial hostilities, Roosevelt's black and Hispanic enrollment grew. Although heroin lowered gang violence, New York City teetered on bankruptcy in 1975, and the 1977 blackout incited massive looting, triggering a domino effect of rapid urban decay, including soaring crime rates and white flight. By 1980, the South Bronx, largely rubble, was notorious for having the city's worst public high schools. Then the crack epidemic struck. Many adolescents from the city's most violent neighborhoods, policed by especially corrupt officers, were zoned to Roosevelt, which, having the city's highest dropout rate in 1984, symbolized the educational disaster.

In 1986, with a new principal, efforts began to raise Roosevelt's attendance. But improvement was negligible until 1992, when the next new principal, Thelma Baxter, led an astonishing turnaround. Upon Baxter's 1999 promotion to superintendent of schools in Manhattan's Harlem section, Roosevelt's progress reversed. In 2001, the city's Department of Education, ordered by the state's, commanded Roosevelt to shut down. In 2002, it received its final freshman class. In 2006, about 3% graduated. The Theodore Roosevelt High School then closed.

From the 1920s to the 1960s, a number of eventual public figures—journalist Thelma Berlack Boozer, actress June Allyson, actor John Garfield, baseball player Rocky Colavito, all the singers of Dion and the Belmonts, Kiss's lead guitarist Ace Frehley, actor and screenwriter Chazz Palminteri, and comedian and actor Jimmie Walker—had attended the Theodore Roosevelt High School.

== Origination: 1910s–20s ==
=== The setting ===
In the early 20th century, American educators sought to both expand and tailor schooling and to extend school enrollment into adolescence, newly seen as a prime opportunity to properly socialize youth, especially to assimilate the rapidly growing immigrant populations of cities. Helping to define, or even to create, this concept of adolescence as the transition from childhood to adulthood, high schools became venues where youth vied for control over identity, behavior, and allegiance, while the 19th century's esteem for Protestant respectability faded to the 20th century's emergent quests for intricate cosmopolitanism. In a multiethnic city like New York, educators intentionally employed the high school as a fundamental agent of socialization. Entering 1918, the Bronx had two high schools: the Morris and the Evander Childs.

=== The opening ===
The Roosevelt High School was organized on November 14, 1918, from the commercial classes comprising a Morris High School annex conducted in PS 31, located at 144th Street and Mott Avenue, thereupon Roosevelt's location. Initially led by teacher Edward M Williams, Roosevelt's 830 students got their first principal—William R Hayward—on December 9, 1918. On January 8, 1919, two days after the earlier United States President Theodore Roosevelt, a Progressive Era leader born in Manhattan, had died, New York City schools' Board of Superintendents proposed a name change, approved two days later by the New York City Board of Education. The next day, principal Hayward announced the Theodore Roosevelt High School, and sought its namesake's spirit to preside over it. Rapidly growing, Theodore Roosevelt High School gained its own annex—16 classrooms in PS 47—later that very month, on January 22, 1919.

=== The borough ===
From 1900 to 1920, the population of the Bronx, the city's fastest growing borough, grew over two and a half times. The Bronx Board of Trade concluded, "It is probably due to the fact that its housing conditions are of the best that The Bronx for years has had the lowest death rate and the highest birth rate of any of the Boroughs". Over those 20 years, spending on Bronx building construction was substantial, averaging some $24 million per year, but 1921 saw record spending, over $75 million. Yankee Stadium opened in 1923. Throughout the 1920s, upscale apartments, highly coveted, rapidly went up along the Grand Concourse, and were promptly rented mostly by affluent doctors, lawyers, and businessmen. Up to some 80% of the Concourse's residents were Jews, the group leading the Bronx's rapid population growth, fostered by newly built subway lines, enabling rapid travel from lower Manhattan, that connected to a network of Bronx trolley lines.

=== The building ===
By 1922, Theodore Roosevelt High School had over 1460 commercial students, who were focusing on accounting or secretarial skills in programs ranging from one to four years. Roosevelt obtained a second annex on September 25, 1925 (in PS 70), a third annex on February 1, 1926 (in PS 73), and a fourth annex, but this one in Manhattan, on February 1, 1928 (in PS 39). Entering its ninth year, Roosevelt carried over 150 teachers and 4000 students. By 1920, however, there had already been calls to construct for Roosevelt its own building. In 1926, ground had been broken for the new building on May 18, and the building's cornerstone laid on November 17, on Fordham Road, several blocks east of its intersection with the Grand Concourse, and directly across the street from the sprawling campus, with Collegiate Gothic architecture, of Fordham University, founded in 1841. At 500 East Fordham Road, the building of Theodore Roosevelt High School opened in September, 1928.

== Continuation: 1930s–60s ==
=== Depression ===
Starting in 1929, the Great Depression damaged many livelihoods in the Bronx. And yet the borough's Democratic Party's boss, Edward J Flynn, had close ties with Franklin D Roosevelt—previously New York state's governor and a cousin of Theodore Roosevelt—who became US president in 1933. Via Flynn's influence, US government then heavily subsidized public works in the Bronx, whose Central Post Office, Triborough Bridge, Whitestone Bridge, and Orchard Beach were built, while parks and schools were revitalized, in the 1930s. Reachable locally by trolleys, Orchard Beach, unlike the carnival atmosphere in Brooklyn at Coney Island, had elegant bathhouses, and was called by a community leader "The Riviera of the Bronx". And yet the Bronx retained plenty farmland even in the 1940s. Covering two city blocks square, Theodore Roosevelt High School's building was among America's largest and best equipped with science laboratories, sewing and music rooms, automotive and woodworking shops.

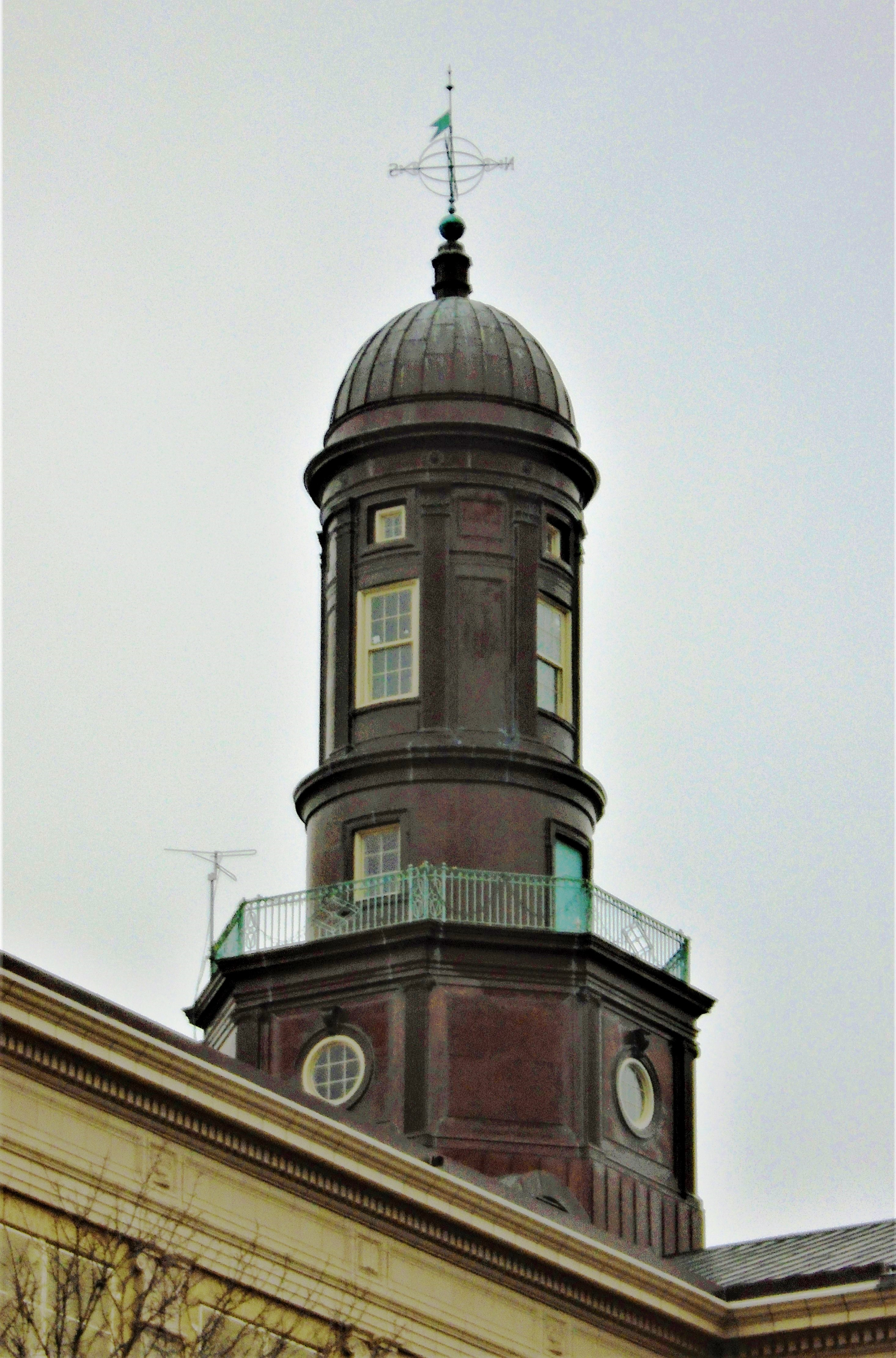
The building's steeple (February 2020)

=== Populations ===
The journalist Thelma Berlack Boozer, a black woman, while graduating with Roosevelt's highest average until then, was the valedictorian of 1924. The Bronx was home, then, mostly to American whites, whereas Irish were the predominant minority group, while both Italians and Jews were increasing, and blacks were scarce. Having fled famine in the 19th century and commonly worked in America laying railroads, the Irish, the earliest immigrants, dominating the area, frequently harassed Jews, whose families, however, were usually fervent about education. Although the Belmont section, Roosevelt's home since 1928, was soon a Little Italy represented highly in Roosevelt's student body, students came from diverse neighborhoods, including the Bronx's affluent strip, the Grand Concourse. There mostly Jews, filled the luxury apartment buildings, built in the 1920s.

In 1930, holding a master's degree in education from Columbia University, Sarah L Delany, stymied in securing a job in her area of expertise, at last maneuvered to be hired before the school's administration had met her. On her first day of work, Delany was a shocking sight and awkward presence—a black woman teaching at a "white high school"—but, already hired through bureaucratic formality, was too difficult to release. Roosevelt thus became New York City's first high school to employ a nonwhite teacher of home economics. Decades after retiring in 1960, Delany rejoiced, "I spent the rest of my career teaching at excellent high schools!" But by the 1950s, despite large emigration of blacks and Hispanics from the American South and the Caribbean to New York City, members of a local gang, the Fordham Baldies, white were menacing these groups in the neighborhood of Roosevelt, whose enrollment remained overwhelmingly white.

=== Participation ===
Focused on adolescence as a period to integrate youth, especially from immigrant populations, into society via high school, American educators emphasized voluntary participation in extracurricular activities. From 1931 to 1947, some 80% of graduates from New York City high schools had been extracurricularly active, as in sports or clubs. Participation was highest, 99%, at Bay Ridge High School, a girls' school in Brooklyn, and was lowest, 56%, at Theodore Roosevelt High School. Throughout the city, some 75% of blacks participated extracurricularly, but black boys' prominence only on track teams may reflect a strong exclusionary bias.

Many parents, especially of recent immigration, wanted their daughters away from male peers altogether, a factor commonly important to Italians, comprising nearly 33% of Bay Ridge High School's students, many of whom commuted from a wide area since parents viewed this girls' high school as "safe", like a parochial school. Although Brooklyn's Bay Ridge section was mainly American white, as were some 25% of the high school's students, faculty may have encouraged universal involvement and prevented spontaneous ethnic segregation, as Italian girls and the few black girls alike were extracurricularly involved far more than elsewhere, a stark contrast from black boys at Roosevelt.

=== World War ===
In 1938, while still a Theodore Roosevelt High School student, June Allyson joined the Broadway chorus line Sing Out the News. With World War II's 1939 outbreak, curricula at American public schools were redirected toward the war effort. On October 8, 1940, vowing to keep America out the war, Wendell Willkie, the Republican Party's presidential candidate for that year's election, gave a speech at Theodore Roosevelt High School, and died that day in 1944. By then, Allyson had become "the apple of Hollywood's eye in the war years and everyone's notion of the girl next door". Meanwhile, preparing students less for college entrance than for practical jobs, Roosevelt "wasn't a progressive academic institution", and "never was".

On a rainy day, October 21, 1944, campaigning for reelection, President Franklin D Roosevelt rode by motorcade through the Bronx tiredly waving, while children in onlooking crowds apprehended a connection to a world outside the Bronx. For many adults, including some who taught at Roosevelt, the 1945 death of President FDR—in the White House a dozen years while leading America through the Great Depression and World War II—severed a sense of continuity with the past. In 1947, opposing communism, the Catholic War Veterans of New York accused the city's Board of Education of aiding subversives by letting the communist group American Youth for Democracy hold meetings in Roosevelt's building, which was similarly used by diverse organizations.

=== Transformation ===
In the 1950s, four friends from the Belmont section, a Little Italy in the Bronx, formed Dion and the Belmonts, whose members, lead singer Dion DiMucci, first tenor Angelo D'Aleo, second tenor Fred Milano, and baritone Carlo Mastrangelo, had all been Roosevelt students together.

Meanwhile, during the 1950s, Cleveland Indians baseball player Rocky Colavito, born in the Bronx in 1933, inspired Cleveland fans' maxim Don't knock the Rock, seen as "everything a ballplayer should be". A Sporting News article of June 10, 1959, named him the American League player most likely to break Babe Ruth's record, 60 home runs in a season. Yet Rocky experienced a slump, and the next year, 1960, was traded to the Detroit Tigers. In 1994, upon sportswriter Terry Pluto's "loving tale" of a curse on the Cleveland franchise ever since, Colavito proclaimed innocence. Yet already, head had confessed to, he said, "a big mistake". Nearing 1950, at a tryout at Yankee Stadium, a scout for Cleveland's minor-league team witnessed just one throw by Colavito and recruited him, prompting Colavito's successful petition against the league's rule against signing anyone before his high-school class had graduated. Colavito thus dropped out of Roosevelt after his sophomore year to play semipro baseball. Colavito later rued, "I didn't want kids to say, 'He dropped out of school and he made the big leagues' ".

In the 1960s, newly hired teacher Alfred Posamentier organized Roosevelt's first mathematics teams, but soon left to join academia and spearhead efforts to improve mathematics teachers' effectiveness. Roosevelt students of the late 1960s included Ace Frehley, later the lead guitarist of Kiss, and Chazz Palminteri, later the actor whose 1988 play A Bronx Tale was partly his own childhood memoir, based in Belmont. Adapted to a 1993 screenplay, it became Robert De Niro's directing debut. Frehley had attended a private Lutheran school, but, "too wild", was ejected, went to the public DeWitt Clinton High School, "a progressive place" in the Bronx, but was one of only a couple of students with long hair, refused to cut it, and was transferred to Roosevelt, where he focused on art courses, got bored, and dropped out, yet returned and graduated. Palminteri, too, had attended Clinton, but, disliking its being all male, transferred to Roosevelt, where this poor student, who got girls to do his homework, graduated in 1973 at age 21. Although later actor Jimmie Walker's diploma was from Clinton, he met its requirements in 1965 by attending night classes at Roosevelt, whose summer sessions, too, taught students of other high schools.

== Deterioration: 1970s–80s ==
=== Drug culture ===
During the 1950s, as US government's policy shifted Puerto Rico's economy from agriculture to manufacturing, many Puerto Ricans sought sustainable work by emigrating to New York City. After similar moves to New York, emigrant blacks from the American South and from the Caribbean increasingly emerged from poverty, a progress that slowed in the 1960s and halted by about 1970, however, amid rising stagflation and US government's focus on the Vietnam War.

Previously scarce within American ethnic minority groups, illegal drug selling emerged in the 1960s. Seeking heroin, white gang members began venturing into the neighborhoods of blacks and Puerto Ricans, who, no longer menaced by these whites, increasingly enrolled at Roosevelt, where illegal drug selling became prevalent by the late 1960s. Further, heroin offered young gang members a new masculinity token—heroin usage without addiction—while elder gang members, commonly addicted, seeking to diminish police attention while possessing the narcotic, formed truces. Paradoxically, then, early drug culture lowered gang violence.

=== Urban decay ===
In the aftermath of New York City government's near bankruptcy in 1975, the city's 1977 blackout triggered massive looting that bankrupted many stores. Many Bronx neighborhoods, resembling rubble by 1979, went aflame, while apartment buildings were abandoned or else sold to lesser landlords amid severe, rapid urban decay. The view of schools as a collaborative effort emphasized agreement among workers, potentially in the educational bureaucracy for decades, whereas points of central importance in educating adolescents, each in high school for only a few years, fell off the agenda, dominated by the lowest common denominator—the adults' widest agreement. While many educational administrators and officials maneuvered to secure school jobs for their own families and friends, the students got insufficient attention. Although it takes a strong leader, perhaps unpopular, to turn schools around, voters may lack the attention or interest to vote accordingly. Dissatisfied parents who have the financial means, then, simply enroll their children in private schools—or move their families elsewhere.

=== Local problems ===
From 1970 to 1980, New York City's population fell from nearly eight to a little over seven million via white flight, while crime, ranging from vandalism to murder, soared, and then, nearly midway through the 1980s, the crack epidemic struck Bronx high schools were reputed as the city's worst, while Theodore Roosevelt High School signified the degeneration. In 1984, Roosevelt had New York City's highest dropout rate. In 1986, Roosevelt had a new principal, Paul B Shapiro, and spent an extra $750 thousand—atop its normal budget of $10 million—to raise school attendance.

The jurisdiction of the New York City Police Department's 46th Precinct—adjacent westward of the 48th Precinct's jurisdiction, which contained Roosevelt High—was notoriously homicidal among New York City's 75 precincts. The zone high school for residents of neighborhoods policed by the 46th Precinct, Roosevelt received those troubles, including police officers who aided drug tracking and menaced residents. In 1989, a pilot program at Evander Childs High School found metal detectors at student entrances effective, especially as to guns. Among the New York City schools deemed most violent, Roosevelt was among the first dozen more to get metal detectors. New York City's homicide count peaked in 1990.

=== Internal dilemmas ===
Some students figured out how to sneak metal weapons past Roosevelt's metal detectors, while other Roosevelt students sustained threats riding public transportation to school. Local gang members posed the specter of random slashings for gang initiations. Versus many other high schools' students, Roosevelt's had been more greatly beset by the specter of AIDS. Allegedly, all of Roosevelt's students lived below the poverty line. Nearly one in three Roosevelt students, speaking English as a second language, needed help learning English. Or a student could enter Roosevelt unable to read, and, once there, soon cease attending.

Some students kept attending, but barely did schoolwork. Often failing to graduate in four years, or even in five years as "superseniors", some became "ultraseniors", perhaps still students at age 21, when nongraduating students would be dropped by the school system. Among New York state's worst schools, Roosevelt was placed on the New York State Department of Education's list of failing schools. And yet New York City's educational bureaucracy—the seven appointed members of the NYC Board of Education, its hired chancellor of schools, the 32 school districts' 32 elected school boards, and the 32 school districts' 32 hired superintendents—shielded anyone from blame for the deterioration.

== Rejuvenation: 1990s ==
=== Vigorous leadership ===
In 1992, Thelma B Baxter—whose mother had been Roosevelt's valedictorian in 1923—became Roosevelt's principal. Baxter extended class hours and ensured that students retained the same teacher in a subject for both semesters during a school year. Though finding "100 percent" of the students poor, she found parents' problems no excuse for staff allowing students to do poorly. Despite having "basically the same school", Baxter ensured that they "put tougher standards in place". Though Baxter was "pugnacious" like the school's namesake, students often stopped by her office to talk, seek advice, or embrace, and Baxter frequently walked the halls while accosting students, newly prohibited from wearing hats inside the building. In a four-year span, Roosevelt students taking the math Regents exam rose from some 200 to over 500.

In January 1996, after three years of rising attendance, test scores, and graduation rate, Theodore Roosevelt High School left the state education department's list of failing schools, and Baxter was the subject of a New York Times editorial. During the next two years, the suspension rate fell some 50%. In September 1997, Baxter had begun "moral and efficacy" seminars where freshmen were shown videos and discussed issues of school attendance and right versus wrong. Roosevelt also began a "Saturday Institute" where some 500 middle-school students and their parents attended workshops and tutoring to help prepare for high school. At Mayor Rudy Giuliani's 1998 initiative to push students in high school beyond five years into night or weekend schools, Baxter pointed out the particular challenges that her students face—such as language barriers and parents returning with them to the Caribbean for significant periods—and asserted that she preferred to keep underperforming students in a "caring atmosphere".

=== Expanding partnerships ===
In the early 1990s, Williams College, often ranked America's best liberal arts college, began an exchange program with Roosevelt. Taken from Roosevelt's honors program, and chaperoned by English teacher Frank Brown, select students periodically visited the Williams campus, and, demonstrating commitment to the program, then graduating from Roosevelt, received full scholarships to Williams. In 1998, the same English teacher, Frank Brown, simultaneously the soccer coach, led the Roosevelt team against Martin Luther King High School in the championship game. During it, Roosevelt learned and immediately alerted the governing bureau that two of King's star players were ineligible, having played in Nigeria too many high-school seasons. After the game, coach Brown and principal Baxter sought not the 1998 boys soccer title, but merely its revocation from King. Although acknowledging the two King players' ineligibility, the Board of Education denied Roosevelt's petition, as did the city's public schools' athletic governing bureau, which maintained that petitions must be filed before a game. Upon finding Roosevelt's representatives accused of pettiness in a New York newspaper, Brown asserted Roosevelt's stance to instead be principled.

In September 1998, to implement at Roosevelt an afterschool program, The After-School Corporation granted $200 thousand to Phipps Houses, which in turn hired singer Russell Glover, once of the Boys Choir of Harlem, to create and direct the program: Superior Effort Afterschool Liberates (SEAL). From 3pm to 5pm, SEAL included 14 activities involving some 400 of Roosevelt's roughly 4000 students. The highlight, apparently inspired by Las Vegas and hip hop, was the "Russell Glover Show", three hours long, a revue—including break dancing, fashion show, gymnastics, karate, singing, and other performances, mostly by SEAL participants—that by April 1999, its fourth show, held in Roosevelt's gymnasium, drew a crowd of some 1000 Roosevelt students. A ninth grader remarked, "This show gets kids motivated. It gives you the idea that you can do something with your life". Finding "crossover value" in SEAL activities, Baxter commented, "To prepare to be academically successful, kids need to develop their bodies and minds". Actually, Glover mostly prepared students for job training or job hunting. During Baxter's span at Roosevelt, its community partnerships rose from four to thirty. Although Roosevelt still lagged behind other New York City high schools, Roosevelt's rapid turnaround brought Baxter a citywide acclaim, then a national acclaim.

== Termination: 2000s ==
=== Giuliani mayorship ===
On November 8, 1995, some 900 people, mostly parents, gathered for about two hours in the Roosevelt building. That evening, Rudy Crew, the newly appointed chancellor of New York City's public schools, gave the first of a series of talks, in all five city boroughs, about Crew's vision for the school system, which covered just over a million students. Crew vowed that his chancellorship would be "about children first, foremost, finally, and forever". Meanwhile, amid reports of school problems or bureaucratic corruption or incompetence, New York City's mayor, Rudy Giuliani, would scorn the city's Board of Education. Giuliani once added, "This is why control of schools should be given to the mayor". In 1999, while several cities, including Boston, Chicago, and Cleveland, had given mayors, in fact, more control over schools, Mayor Giuliani, during that year's budget speech, instead lamented, "The whole system should be blown up".

In the summer of 1999, Chancellor Crew approved the appointment of Roosevelt's principal Thelma Baxter to a new position, the superintendent of School District 5, located in central Harlem. Seeking to mimic and expand her Roosevelt successes, Baxter left Roosevelt. The next year, in 2000, the New York State Department of Education's list of failing schools reclaimed Roosevelt, graduating 33% of its students in their fourth years, versus the citywide average of 50%. In 2001, the department ordered the school, also considered violent, to begin shutdown. The last freshman class, entering in 2002, would yield the Theodore Roosevelt High School's final graduating class in 2006. While several small high schools opened within the four-story building, Roosevelt High occupied only the first and fourth floors, and yet hosted about double the citywide average of reported incidents, ranging from loitering to felony assault.

=== Bloomberg mayorship ===
In January 2004, deeming the city's Department of Education too nonchalant, Mayor Michael Bloomberg asserted responsibility for the city's generally underperforming public schools. Further, he announced that some, newly identified as "impact" schools, would get extra police presence. That month, a riot in the suspension center at Roosevelt prompted pressure to put Roosevelt on the city's list of schools called the "Dangerous Dozen". During that month, Roosevelt would sustain 110 "criminal and disorderly incidents", although it often went unmentioned that many of them, although within Roosevelt, had been committed by other schools' students, not by Roosevelt's students. The violence in Roosevelt, having earlier fallen, resurged once the city's Department of Education placed on the fourth floor of Roosevelt's building the suspension center, intended for up to 20 students suspended from various Bronx high schools for infractions ranging from vandalism to striking teachers, and yet reduced the number of security staff available there.

In April 2004, or three months after the riot, Mayor Bloomberg announced the addition of four schools, including Roosevelt, to the list of "impact" schools, especially violent, to get extra police presence. In June 2005, with Roosevelt's enrollment down to about 1 500 students and its building newly housing several small schools, Mayor Bloomberg visited Roosevelt to announce, before news media, that six schools, including Roosevelt, treated in the "impact" program had shown sharp falls in crime. Others, too, found Roosevelt's building calmer. In the past year, misdemeanor assaults fell from 13 to 6, felony assaults from 5 to 1, and sexual assaults from 3 to 0. Meanwhile, the small-schools movement gained Bloomberg's favor. Widely troubled, the city's large high schools sustained widespread shutdowns. On June 30, 2006, Roosevelt's final class graduated at the lowest rate among the city's large high schools, 3%. The Theodore Roosevelt High School then closed. (Its building was renamed the Theodore Roosevelt Educational Campus, housing six small high schools: the Belmont Preparatory High School, the Bronx High School for Law and Community Service, the Fordham High School for the Arts, the Fordham Leadership Academy for Business and Technology, the West Bronx Academy for the Future, and the Knowledge and Power Preparatory Academy.)

== Notable alumni ==
- June Allyson (1917-2006), was an American stage, film, and television actress, dancer, and singer.
- Dion and the Belmonts, American vocal group of the late 1950s. Dion DiMucci, Carlo Mastrangelo, Fred Milano are all Roosevelt students.
- Thelma Berlack Boozer (1906-2001), a leader in feminists movement and African-American in journalist, publicist, and city official in New York.
- Rocky Colavito (1933-2024), Major League Baseball All-Star player, who was best known playing for the Cleveland Indians
- Ace Frehley (1951-2025), American musician and songwriter best known as the original lead guitarist and co-founding member of the rock band Kiss (attended the school, but did not graduate)
- John Garfield (1913-1952), was an American actor
- Sammy Mejía (1983-), Dominican American retired professional basketball player
- French Montana (b 1984), is a Moroccan-American rapper.
- Ben Oglivie (1949-), Panamanian-American retired professional baseball player; first non-American-born player to lead the American League in home runs (1980)
- Chazz Palminteri (1952-), American actor, screenwriter, producer and playwright
- Zachary "Skeeter" Reece (1950/1951-), professional clown
- Raymond Smullyan (1919-2017), American logician, mathematician, and puzzle creator
- Jimmie Walker (1947-), American actor and comedian attending night classes at Roosevelt.
