= Teunis G. Bergen =

American politician (1806–1881)

Teunis Garret Bergen
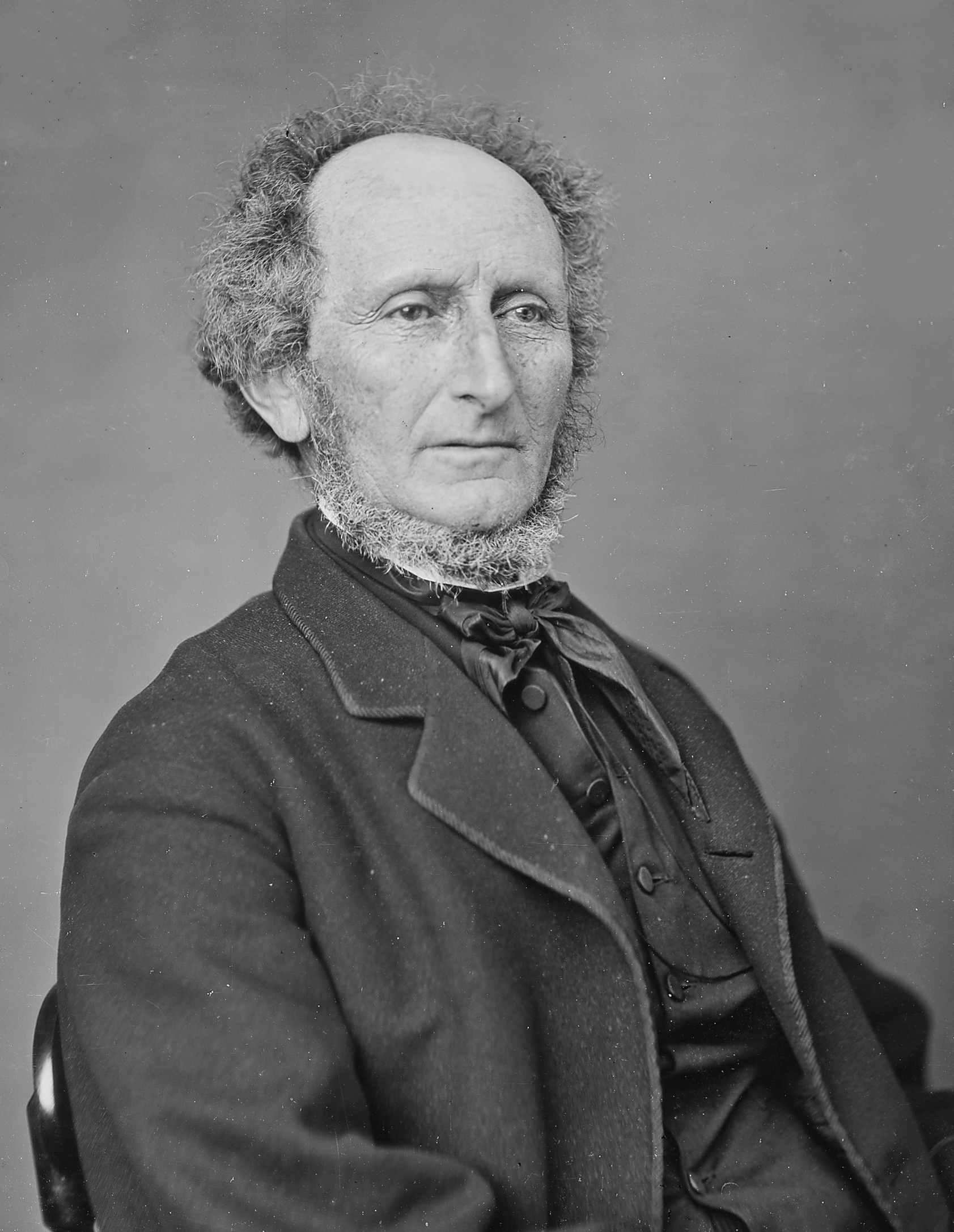

Member of the U.S. House of Representatives from New York's 2nd district
- In office March 4, 1865 – March 3, 1867
- Preceded by: Martin Kalbfleisch
- Succeeded by: Demas Barnes

Personal details
- Born: October 6, 1806 Brooklyn, New York, United States
- Died: April 24, 1881 (aged 74) Brooklyn, New York, US
- Party: Democratic Party
- Spouse: Elizabeth Roelof Van Brunt Bergen
- Children: 1
- Education: Erasmus Hall Academy
- Profession: farmer, surveyor, politician, writer, historian

Military service
- Branch/service: New York State Militia
- Rank: colonel
- Unit: Two Hundred and Forty-first Regiment

Teunis Garret Bergen (October 6, 1806 – April 24, 1881) was an American farmer and politician who served one term as a United States representative from New York from 1865 to 1867.

== Biography ==
Born in Brooklyn, New York, Bergen was the son of Garrett and Jane Wyckoff Bergen and the second cousin of John Teunis Bergen, also a U. S. Representative from New York. He attended the common schools and Erasmus Hall Academy (in Flatbush). He married Elizabeth Roelof Van Brunt on December 19, 1827, and they had one son. His family owned at least 46 enslaved people in 1810.

Bergen engaged in agricultural pursuits and surveying and was supervisor of New Utrecht, Kings County, New York, from 1836 to 1859. He was a member of the New York constitutional conventions in 1846, 1867, and 1868, and was a delegate to the Democratic National Conventions at Baltimore and Charleston in 1860.

=== Tenure in Congress ===
Bergen was elected as a Democrat to the Thirty-ninth Congress and served as U. S. Representative for the second district of New York holding office from March 4, 1865, to March 3, 1867. He was not a candidate for renomination in 1866 and resumed agricultural pursuits and surveying near New Utrecht, and also engaged in literary and historical work.

=== Military ===
Having served as ensign, captain, adjutant, and lieutenant colonel, Bergen was colonel of the Two Hundred and Forty-first Regiment, New York State Militia (known as Kings County Troop).

== Death ==
Bergen died in Brooklyn, Kings County, New York, on April 24, 1881.

== Legacy ==
New York City Public School 9 in Brooklyn was previously named after Teunis G. Bergen; in 2019 the school was renamed to "PS9 Sarah Smith Garnet," after Sarah J. Garnet the first Black woman to serve as a principal in New York City. The name change followed a movement to remove the slaveholding Bergen family name from a school whose students are 40 percent African American. An advertisement from 1819 surfaced, in which Teunis' uncle, Teunis J. Bergen, offered a reward of $40 for the return of Sam and Dinah, an African American couple who had escaped from slavery on the Bergen estate along with their three-year-old child.

== See also ==
- Hans Hansen Bergen

U.S. House of Representatives
| Preceded by Martin Kalbfleisch | Member of the U.S. House of Representatives from New York's 2nd congressional district 1865–1867 | Succeeded by Demas Barnes |
