= Mentholatum =

American maker of non-prescription health care products

The Mentholatum Company, Inc.

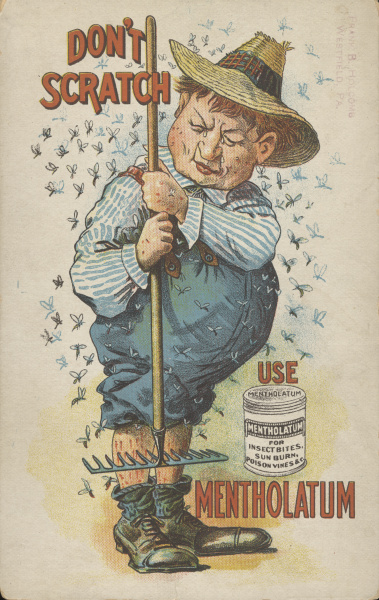
- Type: Subsidiary
- Industry: Personal Care Products
- Founded: 1889; 137 years ago, in Wichita, Kansas, United States
- Headquarters: Orchard Park, New York, United States
- Key people: Hiroshi Mori (CEO)
- Products: Cosmetics, Pharmaceuticals
- Revenue: $31.6 Million (est. 2007)
- Parent: Rohto Pharmaceutical
- Website: www.mentholatum.com

The Mentholatum Company, Inc. is a maker of non-prescription health care products founded in 1889 by Albert Alexander Hyde in the United States. It was bought out by Rohto Pharmaceutical Co., a Japanese health care company, in 1988. The Mentholatum Company is known for its top three products, Mentholatum Ointment, Mentholatum Deep Heating Rub (branded as "Deep Heat" outside of the United States), and Mentholatum Lip Care. The Mentholatum Company also produces Fletcher's Laxative, a product line purchased in 1984 from Sterling Drug. The Mentholatum Building in Buffalo, New York, was listed on the National Register of Historic Places in 2017.

== History ==
=== Beginning (1889–1935) ===
The beginning of the Mentholatum Company started when Albert Alexander Hyde left the real estate market in 1889. With the collapse of the market, Hyde established a new partnership called the Yucca Company, located in Wichita, Kansas, which focused on manufacturing and marketing shaving creams, laundry soap, and toilet soap. The Yucca Company was the beginning of the Mentholatum Company.

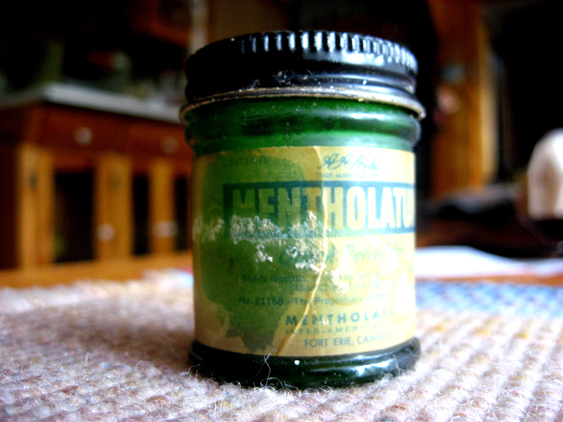
An old bottle of AA Hyde Mentholatum Ointment

When the Yucca Company started manufacturing a cough syrup containing a blend of camphor and menthol, named Vest Pocket Cough Specific, Hyde became intrigued by the soothing and anti-inflammatory effects of menthol. After 4 years of research and experimentation, the company introduced the original "Mentholatum Ointment" in December 1894, which consisted of a combination of menthol and petrolatum. The product was so successful that in 1903, Hyde opened a second office in Buffalo, New York, to handle sales and distribution east of the Mississippi River. In 1906, the Yucca Co. officially incorporated the name the Mentholatum Company after its flagship product, and no longer sold soap. In 1909 a new factory was built in Wichita, Kansas, and in 1919, a second factory was built in Buffalo. The Wichita factory was closed after Hyde's death in 1935, and the corporate offices were moved to Wilmington, Delaware, in 1937 and later to Buffalo in 1945.

=== Japanese expansion and acquisition (1913–1988) ===
Their products spread to Japan through the missionary work of the American, William Merrell Vories. Vories acquired the rights to sell Mentholatum products in Japan in 1913. From 1920, he imported and sold "Mentholatum" through his company the Omi Sales Company. Business continued to thrive in Japan even after Vories died in 1964, but eventually went bankrupt in 1974.

In 1975, a Japanese pharmaceutical company Rohto Pharmaceutical Co. gained trademark rights to Mentholatum from the Mentholatum Company, leading to the manufacture and successful sales of Mentholatum Ointment and Mentholatum Medicated Lip Stick. Rohto acquired the Mentholatum Company Inc. in June 1988.

=== International expansion (1988–1999) ===
In October 1991, the Mentholatum Zhongshan Pharmaceuticals was founded in Zhongshan, Guangdong Province, China, as a joint venture company as well as the headquarters for Chinese expansion. In May 1996, Mentholatum's eye drops began local production and sales in China. P.T. Rohto Laboratories, Indonesia and a new Tokyo Branch Office was also established in September and December 1996, respectively.

In 1998, Mentholatum moved its headquarters to Sterling Drive in Orchard Park, New York. In the mid-1999, the company released a new eye product called Zi, which is designed to cool and refresh the eyes with natural camphor and pH-balanced purified water solution. Later that year, Zi for Eyes was named "Best New Eyecare Product" in the 1999 Superdrug Health & Beauty Awards. The company continued to manufacture new products, such as Migraine Ice (chill pads for migraine sufferers), Softlips Lip Protectant, Deep Heating Rub, Natural Ice Medicated Lip Balm, Pain Patch, Fisherman's Friend cough drops, Fletcher's Castoria, Red Cross Toothache Remedy, Red Cross Canker Sore Medication, and of course, its original Mentholatum Ointment. By the end of 1999, Mentholatum alone had roughly more than $150 million worth of annual sales.

=== Mentholatum in the 21st century ===
As of 2005, the company sells its products in more than 130 countries. Mentholatum acquired the Oxy Skin Care branding (but not all the product formulas) from GlaxoSmithKline in December 2005, and targeted the younger, teen audience with new diversified offerings, packaging, and scents. The company further acquired the Phisoderm brand from Chattem Inc. for $9.6 million on November 30, 2005. In September 2014, the company celebrated its 125th anniversary.

== The Mentholatum Company Buildings ==
- The Mentholatum Company Building
- U.S. National Register of Historic Places
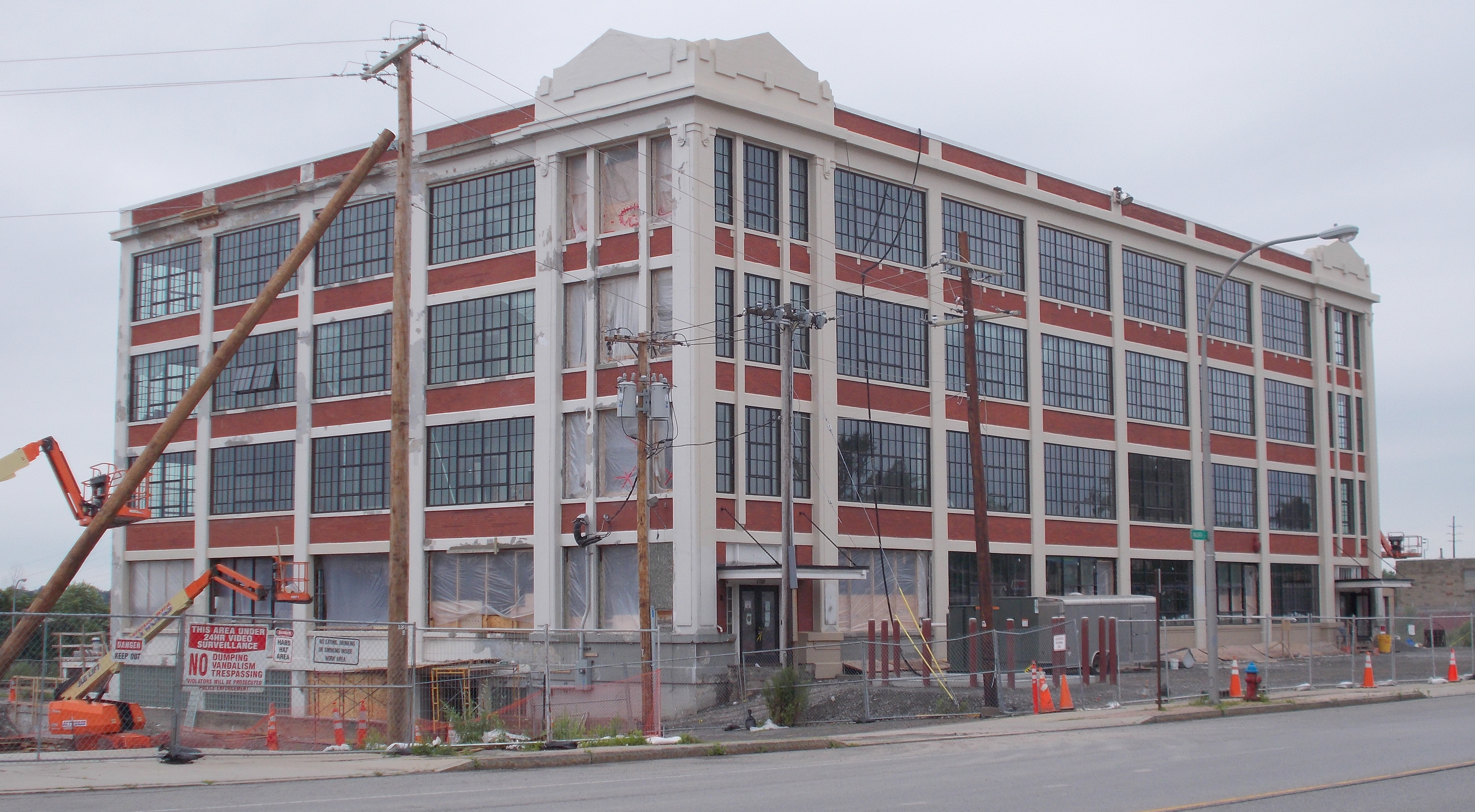
- The Mentholatum Company Building, July 2017

- Location within New York Location within the United States
- Location: 1360 Niagara St., Buffalo, New York
- Coordinates: 42°55′16″N 78°53′56″W
- Area: 0.94 acres (0.38 ha)
- Built: 1919, 1946, 1947, 1966
- Architect: George Townsend
- Architectural style: Daylight Factory
- NRHP reference No.: 100000657
- Added to NRHP: February 21, 2017

The Mentholatum Company Building, also known as the Garrett Leather Building, is a historic factory building located in Buffalo, Erie County, New York. The original section was built in 1919, and is a four-story, reinforced concrete daylight factory building. It has a rectangular plan and is eight bays wide by five bays deep and has a flat roof. A one-story garage / loading dock addition was constructed in 1947, and expanded in 1966. The Mentholatum Company operated out of the building until 1997. The building has been redeveloped as an apartment building known as the Mentholatum.

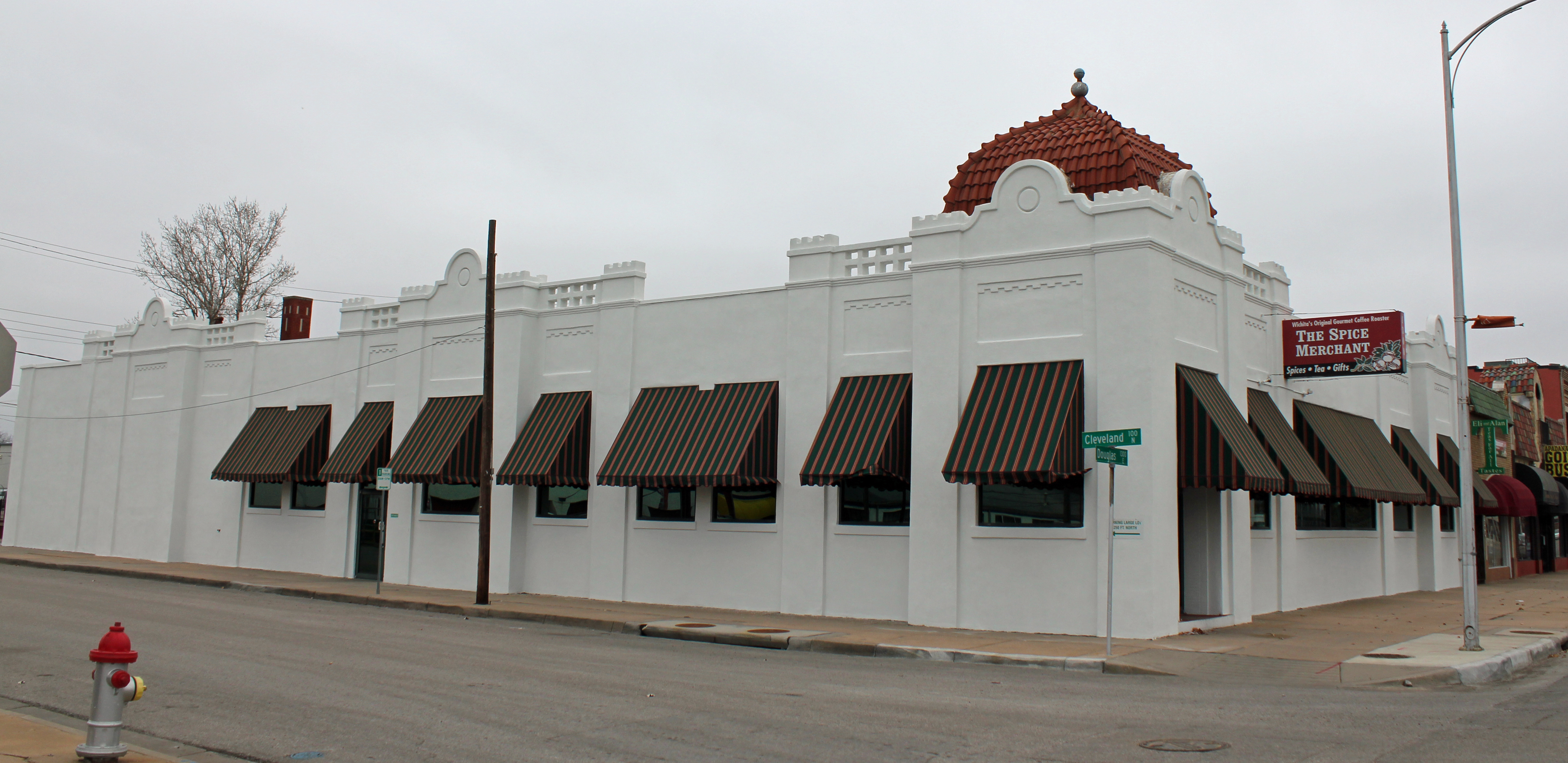
Mentholatum Company Building in Wichita, Kansas

The Mentholatum Company Building at 1300 East Douglas in Wichita, Kansas is also listed on the National Register of Historic Places (National Register of Historic Places listings in Sedgwick County, Kansas). It was designed by Wichita architect U. G. Charles and built by the Wurster Construction Company in 1908. It is associated with the founder of Mentholatum, A. A. Hyde.
