= Equal Suffrage League (Brooklyn) =

Suffrage organization

Equal Suffrage League was a suffrage organization founded by Sarah J. Garnet in Brooklyn, New York, in the late 1880s to advocate for voting rights for African American women. Dr. Susan Smith McKinney Steward was a contributor to the founding of the organization. The group worked to abolish both gender and race bias.

After Garnet became the Superintendent of the Suffrage Department for the National Association of Colored Women (NACW), the Equal Suffrage League affiliated with the National Association of Colored Women. The small organization initially met in Garnet's seamstress shop. In 1907 the Equal Suffrage League and National Association of Colored Women jointly supported a resolution supporting the principles of the Niagara Movement that advocated for equal rights for all American citizens.

The organization was short-lived, ending when Garnet died in 1911.
