= Rohto Pharmaceutical =

Japanese consumer goods company

Rohto Pharmaceutical Co., Ltd.
- Native name: ロート製薬株式会社
- Romanized name: Rōto Seiyaku kabushiki gaisha
- Company type: Public
- Traded as: TYO: 4527
- Industry: FMCG; Pharmaceuticals
- Founded: Higashinari-ku, Osaka, Japan (September 15, 1949, to reorganize "Shintendo, Yasutami Yamada pharmaceutical Company")
- Founder: Yasutami Yamada
- Headquarters: Ikuno-ku, Osaka, Japan
- Key people: Kunio Yamada (chair and CEO, great-grandson of the founder); Masashi Sugimoto (president and COO)
- Revenue: ▲¥120,292 million (FY 2011); ¥115,472 million (FY 2010)
- Operating income: ▲¥13,624 million (FY 2011); ¥13,105 million (FY 2010)
- Net income: ▲¥8,184 million (FY 2011); ¥7,966 million (FY 2010)
- Total assets: ▲¥136,008 million (FY 2011); ¥126,472 million (FY 2010)
- Total equity: ▲¥83,627 million (FY 2011); ¥77,911 million (FY 2010)
- Number of employees: 7,259 (as of March 31, 2024)
- Subsidiaries: Mentholatum; Rohto Advanced Research Hong Kong Ltd
- Website: www.rohto.co.jp/global/

Rohto Pharmaceutical Co., Ltd. (ロート製薬株式会社, Rōto Seiyaku Kabushiki-gaisha) is a Japanese multinational corporation specializing in fast-moving consumer goods and pharmaceuticals, headquartered in Ikuno-ku, Osaka, Japan. The company primary focuses on skin and eye care products. They also produce cosmetics, supplements, and over-the-counter medications.

== International presence ==
In 1975, Rohto gained trademark rights to Mentholatum from The Mentholatum Company Inc., allowing the sale of Mentholatum-branded products. Rohto acquired The Mentholatum Company Inc. in June 1988.

Rohto has two production plants in Japan and six across the US, UK, China, Vietnam, Hong Kong, and Indonesia. Rohto entered the Vietnamese market in 1997 expanding sales to the Asia Pacific region. In mid-2010, Rohto entered the Indian and Bangladeshi markets.

In 2024, Rohto Pharmaceutical entered into a partnership with the Austrian Sigmapharm Group. This partnership aimed at expanding the production and sale of ophthalmic drugs and medical products across Europe, with Rohto Pharmaceutical investing nearly €30 million in research, development, production, and sales.

== History ==
Yasutami Yamada (山田 安民) founded "Japanese: 信天堂山田安民薬房, lit. 'Shintendo Yamada Yasutami Pharmacy'" in Osaka, on February 22, 1899. ROHTO Pharmaceutical Co. is the largest company in Japan's OTC drugs market, commanding a 40% share in the eye-drop sector. The name "Rohto" was inspired by August von Rothmund, (Note: In Japanese, August von Rothmund was known as アウグスト・フォン・ロートムント (Augusuto-fon-Rōtomunto).) a German ophthalmologist who was a professor for Toyotaro Inoue (井上 豊太郎, Inoue Toyotarō), a Japanese ophthalmologist.
