= Sterling Drug =

American pharmaceutical company

Sterling Drug Sterling-Winthrop
- Industry: Health care
- Founded: 1901
- Defunct: 1994
- Fate: Acquired by SmithKline Beecham
- Headquarters: 90 Park Avenue New York, NY 10016
- Products: Lehn & Fink, Bayer Aspirin, Phillips'
- Parent: Eastman Kodak (1988 to 1994)

Sterling Drug was an American based global pharmaceutical company. It was also known as Sterling Winthrop, Inc., after the merger with Winthrop-Stearns Inc. which itself resulted from the merger of Winthrop Chemical Company Inc. and Frederick Stearns & Company. It was formerly known as Sterling Winthrop Pharmaceuticals.

Primary product lines included diagnostic imaging agents, hormonal products, cardiovascular products, analgesics, antihistamines and muscle relaxants.

Chemical compounds produced by this company were often known by their manufacturing code which consisted of the abbreviation WIN (for Winthrop) followed by a number. For example, WIN 18,320 was nalidixic acid, the first quinolone antibiotic.

== History ==
=== 1910s ===
The Company was established in 1901 (then called Neuralgyline Co.) in Wheeling, West Virginia, by Albert H. Diebold and William E. Weiss, a pharmacist. At the end of World War I in 1918, Sterling purchased the US assets of a German company now known as Bayer AG for US$5.3 million. This purchase was directed under the Alien Property Custodian Act. In 1919, Sterling sold its dye division for $2.5 million to the Grasselli Chemical Company (based in Linden, New Jersey), which employed many former Bayer personnel.

=== 1920s ===
A 1920 agreement between Sterling and Bayer was about selling aspirin in the Latin American markets: the profit would be shared fifty-fifty, with Bayer supplying the pharmaceutical and selling mainly via Sterlings salesmen. In 1923, another momentous contract was negotiated: 50% of the profits earned by Sterling's subsidiary Winthrop Chemical, was given to the German Bayer company, which in turn granted licences for new drugs and supported with technical expertise how to produce them. Later, this was turned into a 50% share in ownership. The American Bayer, owned by Sterling, retained the rights to use the "Bayer" brand for selling aspirin in the US, the UK and the Commonwealth. In 1923 Sterling purchased a 25% interest in The Centaur Company, manufacturer of Charles Henry Fletcher's, Fletcher's Castoria.

=== 1940s ===
In 1940, a cross-contamination from equipment sharing resulted in Winthrop Chemical producing contaminated sulfathiazole tablets contaminated with phenobarbital. Each sulfathiazole tablet was contaminated with about 350 mg of phenobarbital. An investigation by US Food and Drug Administration and the findings resulted in actions. The incident was influential in the introduction of Good Manufacturing Practices for drugs.

Mollé Mystery Theatre was a 30-minute anthology radio program that ran from 1943 to 1948 on NBC prior to its moving to the CBS network. The show, sponsored initially by Sterling Drugs, manufacturers of Mollé Brushless Shaving Cream, began airing on Tuesday evenings during prime time. In 1948, Mollé ceased sponsoring the program, and its title became Mystery Theater.

=== 1960s to 1970s ===
In 1967, Sterling Drug acquired Lehn & Fink, the makers of Lysol, Resolve, and d-CON. In 1974, Sterling opened a manufacturing plant in McPherson, Kansas and Aurora, Ontario. The various companies which would eventually acquire Sterling chose to keep the factory open.

=== 1980s to 1990s ===
In 1988, Sterling was acquired by Eastman Kodak for $5.1 billion. In 1993, Eastman Kodak/Sterling Winthrop partnered with a French pharmaceutical company Elf Sanofi (now known as Sanofi). In June 1994, Eastman Kodak sold the prescription drug business of its Sterling Winthrop subsidiary to Sanofi for US$1.675 billion and the return of Kodak's minority stake in Sterling Health Europe. A week later, Sanofi announced that it was not interested in the diagnostic imaging business, which it sold to the Norwegian company Hafslund Nycomed AS for US$450 million.

In August 1994, Kodak sold the remainder of Sterling Winthrop, including its over the counter drug business which had been generating about $1 billion in revenue annually, to the British firm SmithKline Beecham for US$2.925 billion cash. Bayer was a losing bidder for the purchase of Sterling Winthrop, but in September 1994, it purchased the over the counter division of Sterling Winthrop in the US, Canada and Puerto Rico from SmithKline Beecham for $1 billion. Bayer also re-acquired the brand rights to the "Bayer Aspirin" name it had lost because of World War I.

Spinoffs from the sale of Sterling include Starwin Products, created in 1987 from Sterling's original branch in Ghana. The Lehn & Fink division was acquired by Reckitt & Colman (now Reckitt Benckiser) at the time of the deal.

== Notable products ==
- Demerol APAP
- Mebaral
- Novocain
- Luminal
- NegGram (WIN-18,320)
- Talwin Compound Caplets
- Plaquenil
- Demerol
- Aralen
- Danocrine (WIN-17,757)
- Bilopaque
- Winstrol (WIN-14,833)
- Telepaque
- Talwin
- pHisoDerm
- Lotusate

== See also ==
- Sterling-Winthrop Research Centre
