= Fletcher's Laxative =

Brand of oral laxative

The current product box

Fletcher's Castoria, now known as Fletcher's Laxative, is an oral syrup containing a stimulant laxative and ingredients to soothe the stomach. It is a product of The Mentholatum Company, Inc.

== History ==
On May 12, 1868, the United States Patent Office granted a patent to Dr. Samuel Pitcher (1824-1907) of Barnstable, Massachusetts, for a cathartic composed of senna, sodium bicarbonate, essence of wintergreen, dandelion, sugar and water. The remedy was initially sold under the name Pitcher's Castoria. Over time the product formula has changed.

In 1871, The Centaur Company was formed by Charles Henry Fletcher to purchase the rights to and manufacture Pitcher's Castoria. It was renamed Fletcher's Castoria.

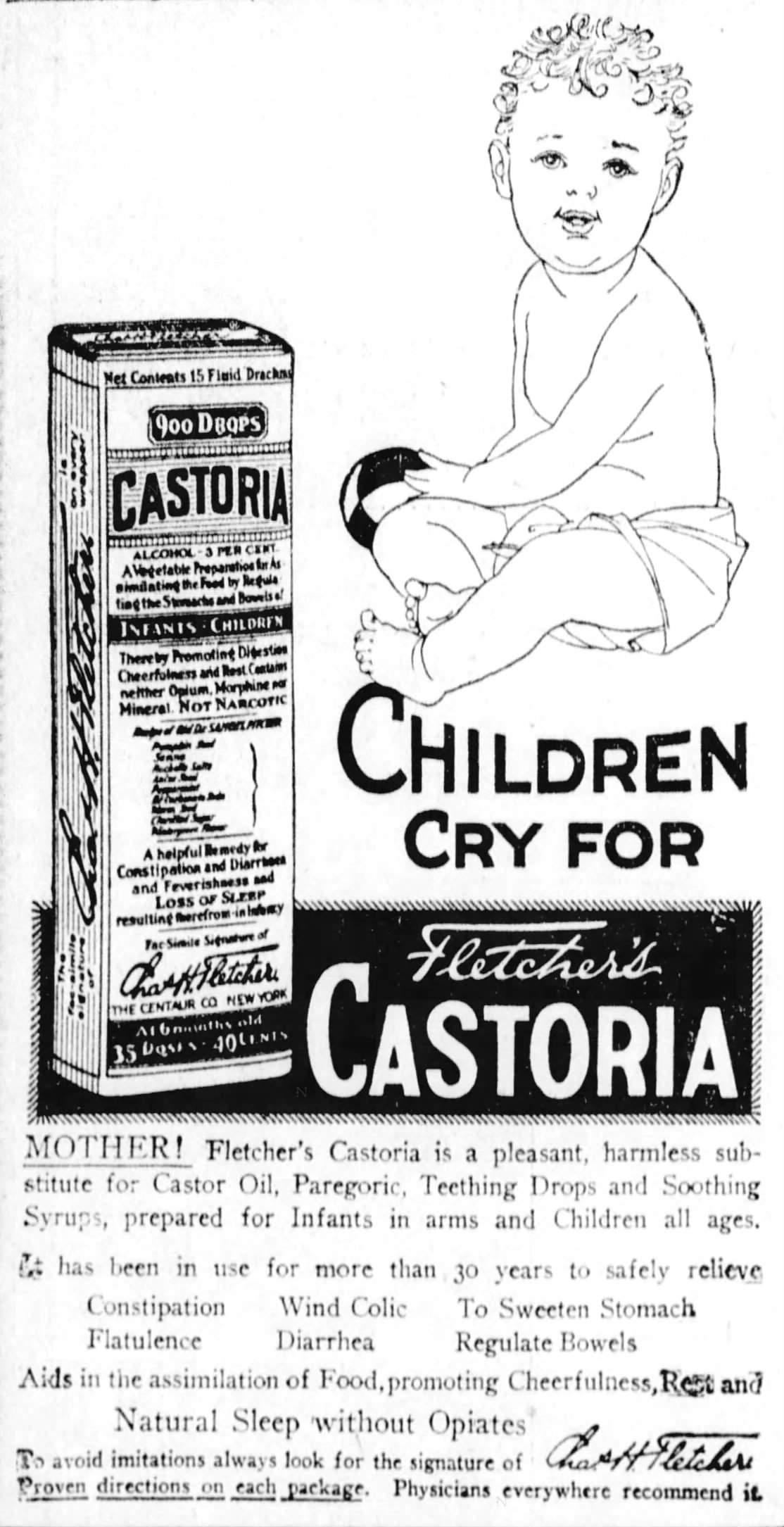
Fletcher s Castoria ad, 1925

Castoria was the subject of one of the most significant campaigns in early mass advertising. Castoria ads from the 1870s through 1920s are still visible today (or at least were between the 1970s and 2005) on the buildings of New York. See and for photos. At the opening of the Brooklyn Bridge in 1883, there were Castoria ads on virtually every blank wall in sight. They are quite visible in images of the opening of the bridge.

There were two "Fletcher's Castoria" B-17 Flying Fortress bombers during World War II, both part of the 100th Bomber Group. The first was lost, but the crew survived. The second survived the war. Its pilot was William H. Fletcher (not a descendant of Charles Henry Fletcher), hence its name.

The Centaur Company was acquired by Sterling Drug during the 1920s. In 1984, Sterling Drug sold Fletcher's Castoria to The Mentholatum Company. In 1988 Rohto Pharmaceutical Co., a Japanese company, purchased Mentholatum, which continues to operate as a Rohto subsidiary.

== Pharmacology ==
- Active laxative ingredient: senna, 33.3 mg/ml
- Other ingredients: citric acid, flavor, glycerin, methylparaben, propylparaben, purified water, sodium benzoate, sucrose
- Non-alcoholic
- Non-prescription

Acts within 6–12 hours.

There are no known drug interactions, although as a stimulant laxative it may affect how long a medicine remains in the digestive tract. It is best not to take senna within 1 to 2 hours of taking other medicines.

== Availability ==
Once known as Fletcher's Castoria, the product has since been renamed Fletcher's Laxative for Kids. Although marketed as a children's laxative in the US, it is effective for adults.

Once a staple of drug stores, Castoria is becoming difficult to find.
