= Demas Barnes =

American politician

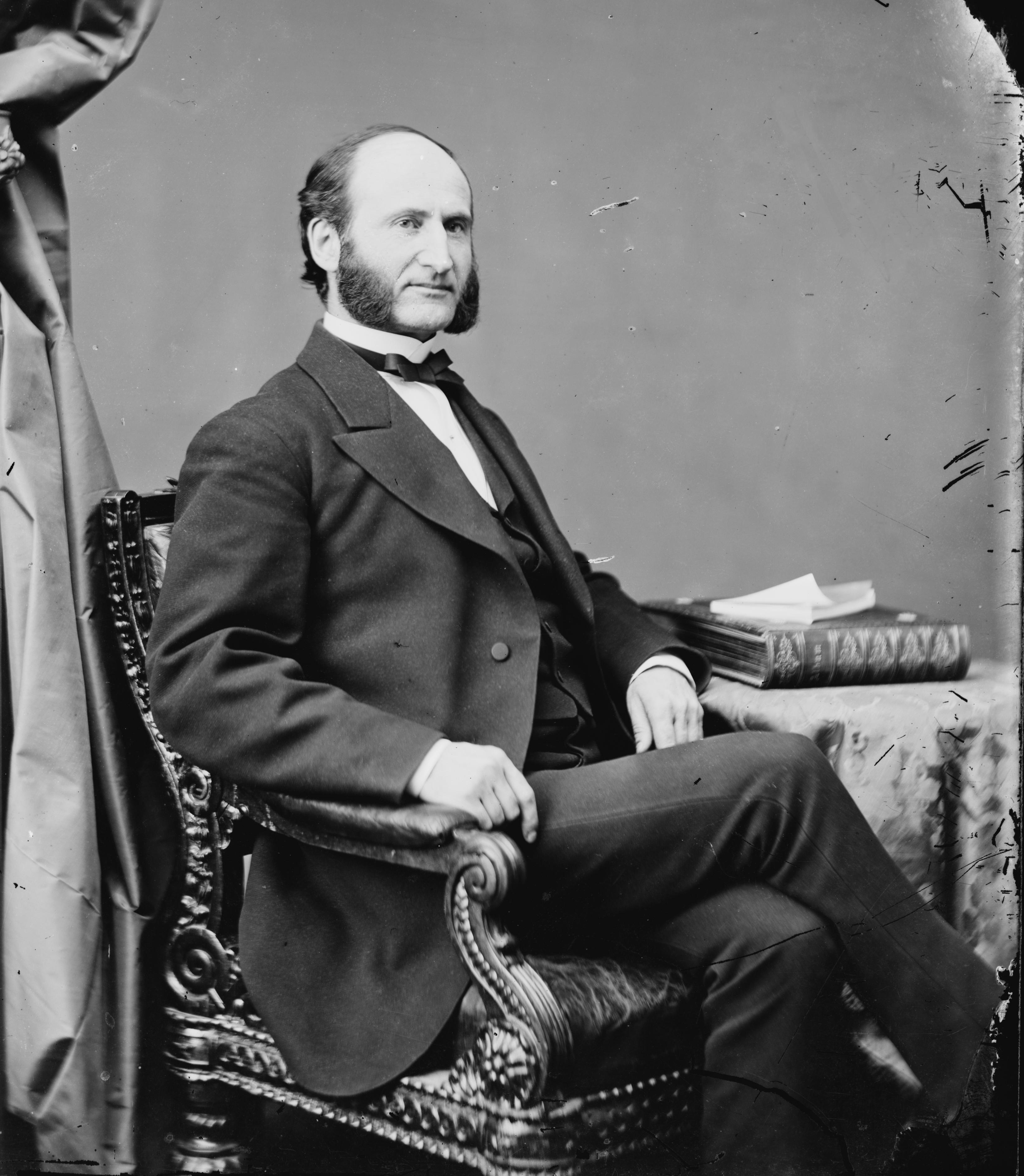

Member of the U.S. House of Representatives from New York's 2nd district
- In office March 4, 1867 – March 3, 1869
- Preceded by: Teunis G. Bergen
- Succeeded by: John G. Schumaker

Personal details
- Born: April 4, 1827 Gorham, New York, U.S.
- Died: May 1, 1888 (aged 61) New York City, U.S.
- Party: Democratic
- Spouses: Mary Hyde (m. 1857; died 1875); Anna Dorinda Blaksley (m. 1878)
- Children: Cora Fanny Barnes; Mildred Barnes Bliss
- Occupation: Politician; patent medicine manufacturer; writer; editor

Demas Barnes (April 4, 1827 – May 1, 1888) was an American businessman and politician and a United States representative from New York, serving one term from 1867 to 1869.

== Early days ==
Born in Gorham Township, Ontario County, New York, Barnes was the son of Demas Barnes and attended public school, then engaged in mercantile pursuits.

== Career ==
Barnes moved to New York City in 1849 and entered in the drug business, including Charles Henry Fletcher's Castoria. Barnes crossed the continent in a wagon and studied the mineral resources of Colorado, Nevada, and California.

=== Business ===
Upon returning to New York City Barnes wrote articles and published works concerning his experiences in the United States. He also started his wholesale drug business in New York City in 1853 and was highly prosperous as a patent medicine manufacturer. He was one of the first to request private die stamps after they were authorized, and the first three Barnes stamps were approved by the Commissioner of Internal Revenue in September 1862. These were the 1¢, 2¢, and 4¢ D.S. Barnes stamps in a vertical format printed in black and in vermillion.

Barnes established and edited the "Brooklyn Argus" in 1873 and was also engaged in the real-estate business. He was a member of the board of education, and was one of the original trustees of the Brooklyn Bridge project.

=== Congress ===
Elected as a Democrat to the Fortieth Congress Barnes served as a U.S. Representative for the second district of New York from March 4, 1867 to March 3, 1869, though was not a candidate for renomination in 1868.

== Personal life ==
Barnes died in New York City, New York, on May 1, 1888 (age 61 years, 27 days). He is interred in Greenwood Cemetery, Brooklyn, New York.

U.S. House of Representatives
Preceded by Teunis G. Bergen	Member of the U.S. House of Representatives from New York's 2nd congressional district 1867–1869	Succeeded by John G. Schumaker
