= Thelma Berlack Boozer =

American journalist, publicist and city official (1906–2001)

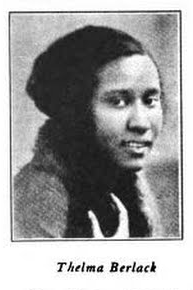
Thelma Berlack Boozer as a college student, from a 1925 publication.

Thelma Edna Berlack Boozer (September 26, 1906 – March 6, 2001) was an American journalist, publicist, and city official in New York.

== Early life and education ==
Thelma Edna Berlack was born in Ocala, Florida, the daughter of Leonard Berlack and Sallie Smith Berlack (later Sallie Barnes). Her father was a railroad clerk, and her mother a dietitian. She moved to New York with her mother, and grandmother Josephine E. Smith, in 1920. She graduated from Theodore Roosevelt High School in the Bronx in 1924 with highest honors, and won a citywide writing prize while still a student there.

At New York University she studied commerce and journalism, earning a bachelor's degree in 1928, and a master's degree in 1931, with a thesis titled "The Evolution of Negro Journalism in the United States".

She was active with the black sorority Alpha Kappa Alpha (AKA) in college, and edited its national publication, The Ivy Leaf. She remained active with AKA, as a regional director, and as chair of the 1934 "boulé" committee, when she organized a live national radio broadcast of the sorority's biannual celebration, including performers Etta Moten and Anne Brown.

== Career ==
Berlack began as a journalist while she was still a college student, reporting from New York for the Pittsburgh Courier from 1924 to 1926. She worked at the New York Amsterdam News during the 1930s, as a reporter, columnist, and eventually assistant managing editor. Her "Woman of the Week" column highlighted interesting African-American women in various professions in the New York area; she wrote another column, "The Feminist Viewpoint", about political topics. For the New York Amsterdam News Berlack covered such topics as interracial marriage. In 1932 she was on the founding board of the Harlem Newspaper Club. In the 1940s she moved to Missouri for a few years, to help start the journalism program at Lincoln University; she was the school's first assistant professor of journalism. In her work, she corresponded with civil rights figures including Horace Mann Bond W. E. B. Du Bois and Martin Luther King Jr.

Back in New York by the mid-1940s, Boozer wrote for the New York Age and Labor Vanguard newspapers, and was a publicist for the United Negro College Fund and other charities. In 1950, she was appointed by New York mayor Robert F. Wagner to Office of the Borough President of Manhattan, where she did public relations work. In 1954 she took a job at the city's Office of Civil Defense, where she was in charge of publications and educational programs. In 1966 major John Lindsay appointed Boozer to be director of publications for the Harlem Hospital Center. She retired from that position in 1973.

Boozer was honored by the Brooklyn Service Women's Organization, the Omega Psi Phi fraternity, the Alpha Kappa Alpha sorority, and the United Negro College Fund for her lifetime achievements. In 1981 she gave an oral history interview to Columbia University for their United Negro College Fund project.

== Personal life and legacy ==
Thelma Berlack married James C. Boozer, a postal employee, in 1930. They had two daughters, Barbara (born 1937) and Thelma (born 1946), who later served for seven years as principal of her mother's Bronx alma mater, Theodore Roosevelt High School. She died in 2001, aged 94 years, in New York.

The Thelma Berlack Boozer Scholarship for Academic Excellence is offered annually by the Tau Omega chapter of Alpha Kappa Alpha Sorority, to students in Manhattan.
