= Sarah J. Garnet =

American activist (1831–1911)

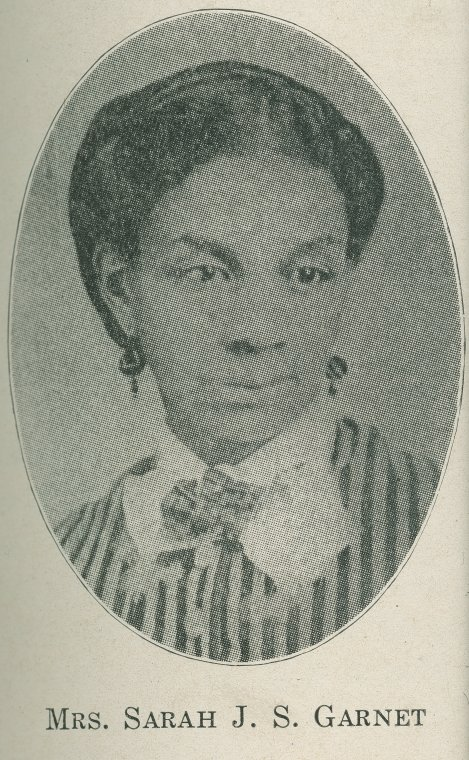
- Born: Sarah Smith; July 31, 1831; Brooklyn, New York, U.S.
- Died: September 17, 1911 (aged 80); New York, U.S.
- Occupations: Educator, suffragist

Sarah J. Tompkins Garnet (née Smith; July 31, 1831 – September 17, 1911) was an American educator and suffragist from New York City who was a pioneer and influential African-American female school principal in the New York City public school system.

== Family and early life ==
Sarah J. Smith, daughter of Sylvanus and Anne (Springsteel) Smith, was born on July 31, 1831, in Brooklyn, New York. She was the oldest of 11 children; her parents were farmers and owned land in Queens County, then part of Long Island. Her sister Susan McKinney Steward was the first African-American woman in New York State to earn a medical degree, and the third in the United States.

She married Samuel Tompkins, who died in approximately 1852. A daughter from that marriage, Serena Jane Tompkins, was an accomplished pianist and organist when she died at forty-seven years old in 1898.

== Pioneer educator ==
When Tompkins began teaching in New York City, the public schools were racially segregated. She began teaching at the African Free School of Williamsburg in 1854, when Brooklyn was a sizeable city still decades from being consolidated in 1898 with New York City (then confined to Manhattan and the Bronx). In February 1863 the untimely death of Charlotte S. Smith, the beloved African American principal of Manhattan's Colored School No. 7 on West 17th Street, created a vacancy. Tompkins was appointed that spring as principal of the school, which around 1866 the Board of Education renamed Colored School No. 4. She taught many prominent students, including musician Walter F. Craig.

Garnet retired from active school service in 1900 having served as teacher and principal for 37 years.

== Suffrage ==
Garnet was the founder of the Brooklyn suffrage organization the Equal Suffrage League in the late 1880s. She was also the superintendent of suffrage for the National Association of Colored Women.

== Later life and death ==
On December 28, 1875, Sarah Tompkins (appearing in some records as Thompkins) wed noted abolitionist Henry Highland Garnet, and thereafter was usually identified as Sarah Garnet. Their Brooklyn marriage ceremony was performed by Amos Noë Freeman, a minister associated with the legendary escape from slavery in 1855 of Anna Maria Weems on the Underground Railroad.

In 1881 President James A. Garfield appointed Henry Garnet as ambassador in Liberia, although Sarah Garnet did not accompany him on the trip. Henry Garnet became ill soon after arriving abroad, and he died on February 13, 1882, in Monrovia.

Sarah Garnet owned a seamstress shop in Brooklyn from 1883 to 1911.

In 1911 Garnet traveled with her sister Susan McKinney Steward to London, England, for the inaugural Universal Races Congress, where Steward presented the paper "Colored American Women". The conference was also attended by W. E. B. Du Bois. Soon after they returned from Europe, Garnet died at home on September 17, 1911. She is buried in Green-Wood Cemetery in Brooklyn.

== Legacy ==
Two public schools in New York City are named for Garnet: PS 9 Brooklyn was renamed Sarah Smith Garnet Public School 9 in 2019 and PS 11 in Manhattan was renamed the Sarah J. Garnet School in 2022. PS 9 Brooklyn was formerly named for Teunis G. Bergen; following a movement to remove the slaveholding Bergen Family name from a school whose students are 40% African-American, on March 28, 2022, the school unveiled a sign with the new name. PS 11, formerly named for William T. Harris, is located in Chelsea, just a few blocks away from the former Colored School No. 4, where Garnet was principal.

Middleton Playground in Brooklyn was renamed in 2021 to Sarah J.S. Tompkins Garnet Playground as a part of an NYC Parks initiative to rename parks in honor of prominent Black Americans.
