= Panadol night =

GlaxoSmithKline painkiller intended for use at night

Panadol night is a GlaxoSmithKline painkiller intended for use at night. It consists of 500 milligrams of paracetamol, 25 milligrams of diphenhydramine hydrochloride (a sedating antihistamine) and other "non-hazardous ingredients". It is sold in Australia, Cyprus, United Kingdom, Ireland, New Zealand and the Middle East. It became available as an over the counter medication in the UK in 1996.

== Active ingredients ==
Panadol night tablets contain two active ingredients, paracetamol and diphenhydramine. Although paracetamol has been widely used for more than a hundred years, scientists still don't fully understand its bio-mechanisms. The main belief is that it reduces the production of prostaglandins in the brain and spinal cord. Diphenhydramine is a sedating H1 antagonist. Diphenhydramine works by blocking the effects of histamine and causes drowsiness. The combination of the active ingredients in Panadol night can be used to relieve mild to moderate pain such as headaches, backache or period pain that is causing difficulty getting to sleep.

== See also ==
- Panadol
