= Robert Woods Bliss =

American diplomat (1875–1962)

26th United States Ambassador to Argentina
- In office 1927–1933
- President: Calvin Coolidge; Herbert Hoover
- Preceded by: Peter Augustus Jay
- Succeeded by: Alexander W. Weddell

Minister of Sweden
- In office 1923–??
- Preceded by: Ira Nelson Morris
- Succeeded by: Leland B. Harrison

Third Assistant Secretary of State
- In office March 16, 1921 – May 3, 1923
- Preceded by: Van Santvoord Merle-Smith
- Succeeded by: J. Butler Wright

Personal details
- Born: August 5, 1875 St. Louis, Missouri, U.S.
- Died: April 19, 1962 (aged 86) Washington, D.C., U.S.
- Spouse: Mildred Barnes (m. 1908)
- Relations: Charles Warren (brother-in-law)
- Education: Harvard University (BA)
- Occupation: Diplomat

Robert Woods Bliss (August 5, 1875 – April 19, 1962) was chief of Western European Affairs in the U.S. State Department from 1920 to 1923 when he was appointed Minister of Sweden. From 1927 to 1933 he served as U.S. Ambassador to Argentina. Bliss and his wife, Mildred Barnes Bliss, collected pre-Columbian and Byzantine art for many years. In 1940 Bliss donated his estate, Dumbarton Oaks, his art collection, and a research library to Harvard University.

== Early life ==
Robert Woods Bliss was born on August 5, 1875, in St. Louis, Missouri, to William Henry Bliss. His father worked as district attorney in St. Louis. He was educated at Episcopal High School in Alexandria, Virginia. Bliss graduated with a Bachelor of Arts from Harvard College in 1900.

== Career ==
From 1900 to 1901, Bliss worked in the office of the secretary of Puerto Rico. He then became private secretary to the governor of Puerto Rico. In 1903, he was appointed as consul at Venice. In 1904, he was second secretary of the embassy in St. Petersburg, Russia. He served in Russia during the Russo-Japanese War and Russian Revolution of 1905. In 1907, he became secretary of the legation at Brussels. He was secretary and later counselor of the embassy at Paris and remained there in World War I. In April 1920, he replaced Albert B. Ruddock as chief of the division of Western European Affairs for the U.S. State Department. He was in charge of ceremonies and protocol during the Washington Naval Conference from 1921 to 1922.

From 1921 to 1923, he served as the third assistant secretary of state under President Warren G. Harding. In January 1923, he was appointed to replace Ira Nelson Morris as Minister of Sweden. In 1927, Bliss was appointed U.S. Ambassador to Argentina. He served in that post until his retirement in 1933. He later served as consultant and special assistant to Secretary of State Cordell Hull.

Following retirement, Bliss was active in the American Red Cross and was chairman of the special gifts division. He served on the board of the Carnegie Institution of Washington and the National Criminal Justice Association. He was honorary president of the American Federation of Arts and served on the board of the Asia Institute and the American Museum of Natural History in New York City.

== Personal life ==
Bliss married his stepsister Mildred Barnes of New York in 1908. Bliss and his wife lived in Dumbarton Oaks, a Georgian mansion in Washington, D.C., for seven years. They donated the mansion and a collection of pre-Columbian and Byzantine art in 1940. The estate was divided into two parcels, the 27 acres (11 ha) Dumbarton Oaks Park and an endowment fund for Harvard University's Byzantine Studies program. His sister Annie Louise married writer Charles Warren.

Bliss died on April 19, 1962, at his home on 28th Street in Washington, D.C.

Government offices
Preceded by Van Santvoord Merle-Smith	Third Assistant Secretary of State; March 16, 1921 – May 3, 1923	Succeeded by J. Butler Wright
