= Small schools movement =

American educational reform movement

The small schools movement, also known as the Small Schools Initiative, in the United States of America holds that many high schools are too large and should be reorganized into smaller, autonomous schools of no more than 400 students, and optimally under 200. Many private schools of under 200 share design features which draw upon the benefits of organizations of less than 200 people. In the public school version of the Small Schools Movement, students may be given a choice of which small school they want to join. Each of the smaller schools would offer students a feeling of connectedness between students who share the same or similar interests with them. In many ways, the small schools in high schools would resemble the team system of many middle schools across the United States. Small schools allow students to have more individual attention from teachers than most average high schools. Many small schools are created by reforming a failed large school into several small ones in the same building, as is the case with the former Theodore Roosevelt High School in the Bronx in New York City.

== Benefits ==
Deborah Meier has argued that a small school allows all of the teachers to sit around a single table and to create a culture of shared decision-making. This should be a central component of a school that intends to teach children to become powerful members of democracy—they should see their teachers acting democratically. Face-to-face democracy is much more likely and practical in a small school.

Positive gains for student achievement within small schools can be seen in Oakland California. According to a study by the Annenberg Institute for School Reform at Brown University "small schools in Oakland are outperforming the large schools from which they emerged. In particular, students are completing more rigorous coursework and dropping out at lower rates, compared to the large schools."

According to The American Dream and the Public Schools by Jennifer L. Hochschild and Nathan Scovronick, smaller class sizes contribute to students in "early grades, and consistently challenging academic courses have been demonstrated to help disadvantaged children achieve, just as they enable middle-class children to achieve."

"Smaller, more intimate learning communities consistently deliver better results in academics and discipline when compared to their larger counterparts. Big schools offer few opportunities to participate." "Students at large schools are more prone to be alienated from their peers or engage in risky behavior."

Other benefits of small schools are noted in a study conducted by UCLA stating that "at their best, small schools are seen as enhancing strong personal bonds, home, and community involvement, improved instructional quality and accountability, and improved teacher working conditions and job satisfaction."

Leading small schools proponent and founder of the Small Schools Coalition and the Grauer School Dr. Stuart Grauer notes, "Research shows overwhelmingly that small schools lead to greater student academic gains and personal adjustment. In fact, data justifying this has been available for decades; it's just that policymakers have largely ignored it, no doubt due to the costs of such programs (and, of course, the politics). Right now, armed guards, metal detectors, and expulsions fail to get to the heart of the problem. (To a serious extent, they can actually create repressive conditions that make the problem worse.) Consequently, many people are looking for another way, and small schools can't be ignored much longer." Why do we keep building gigantic schools when we have such promising data? Dr. Grauer attributes this not only to economics, but to prevailing myths about American education: "Our collective memory of high school includes nostalgia such as proms, football games, exciting social lives, romance, and first cars. No matter that such memories do not apply to most students. The average high school student does not attend sporting events; indeed the larger the school, the smaller the percentage of student participation in these activities. For most students, the social scene in large high schools is tough and unforgiving, with sharp distinctions made between the small group of social haves and the far larger masses of have-nots. And high school memories seldom include a significant academic component, let alone an intellectual one (2001). In other words, many high schools have activities that everyone speaks of with pride—sacred cows like the marching band, the lacrosse team, the boosters. These untouchable activities represent the school's image, and they can't be changed, even though they serve a very small percentage of students and rarely have any connection to the most basic thing of all: the focus on student learning."

Small schools are gaining popularity in the United States not only with students but with donors as well. According to the Neal Peirce Column of The Washington Post Writers Group, "far and away the biggest catalyst is the Bill and Melinda Gates Foundation. It has poured over $1 billion in five years into promoting smaller schools in Boston, Chicago, Milwaukee, and other cities. New York City announced it would be coming on board the small school's movement in 2014. Officials announced that they will open 60 schools with 500 students or less—41 high schools, four traditional middle schools and 15 based on an innovative sixth- or seventh-through-12th grade model."

Research and the growing data on small schools have provided some evidence regarding their better academic quality in comparison to their larger counterparts.

According to Dr. Sharif Shakrani, the co-director of the Education Policy Center at Michigan State University, "Recent studies suggest students in small public high schools perform better academically, have higher attendance rates, feel safer, experience fewer behavior problems and participate more frequently in extracurricular activities."

Shakrani also states that "a number of empirical articles document that students in small public and private high schools have higher achievement levels than those in large schools. Studies found higher student gains in reading, mathematics, science, and social studies at small high schools than at large schools. Moreover, small schools are more likely to have fewer incidents of violence and misbehavior and that, in turn, has been found to contribute to higher attendance and lower drop-out and truancy rates."

== Criticisms ==
Many criticisms stem from the fact that the term "small school" is not uniform. For instance, schools of between 400 and 1,200 students are often researched as small schools despite having few of the attributes of small schools (e.g., a community of 200 or less, class size of less than 15, and similar criteria often applied). Hence, they point out that large schools tend to have a wider diversity of course offerings, as well as more clubs, arts programs, higher-performing sports teams, and other extracurricular activities such as school newspapers and social events. Small school advocates point out that in schools of less than 400 and especially less than 230, students have more access to enrichment and leadership programs. Some schools have abandoned the small school approach after failures to overcome these difficulties, even after being offered grants to continue these experiments. Other districts have expanded this movement by shutting down large schools and opening more smaller ones. The Gates Foundation, which supports and funds small schools, is beginning to change its focus to working directly on improving instruction, giving grants to improve math and science instruction, for example.

== See also ==
- One-room school
- School organizational models
- Small Learning Community
- Storefront school
