= Conlon =

The Conlon family is an Irish noble family, the original Gaelic spelling being Ó Connalláin. In the tenth and eleventh centuries, the O'Conalláin were Princes of Ui Laeghari, an extensive territory in the counties of Meath and Westmeath, where the High King of Ireland historically derived his seat at the Hill of Tara. The O'Conlons were chiefs of Crioch Tullach, in County Tyrone and branches of this family in the twelfth and thirteenth centuries settled in the counties of Roscommon, Galway and Mayo. As a sept of the Northern Uí Néill, they claim descent from Niall of the Nine Hostages and his son Conall Gulban, both High Kings of Ireland.

== Name ==
O'Conlon is a variation of the anglicised version of Ó Connalláin. The name may be derived from two Irish Gaelic words "Con" (the genitive case of Cú, meaning "hound") and "Lón" meaning lion - thereby implying a person who has the characteristics of a lion born of a hound - strength and speed. It is sometimes spelt Conlan, Conlen and Conlin. Like most surnames, it is occasionally used as a first name.

== Origins ==
The O'Conlons are a sept of the Cenél Conaill, or "kindred of Conall", specifically descended as part of Cenél Aedha, through Aedha mac Ainmirech great-great-grandson of Conall Gulban. His father, Ainmirech mac Sétnai is brother of Lugaid mac Sétnai, founder of the Cenél Luighdech. The Cenél Aedha are said to have given their name to the barony of Tirhugh (Tír Aedha) in County Donegal.

Their kingdom was known as Tír Conaill, with their powerbase at Mag Ithe in the Finn valley, however they gradually expanded to cover what is now counties Donegal and Fermanagh. The Cenél Conaill clashed regularly with their kin the Cenél nEogain, eventually capturing the latter's original power-base of Ailech in the Inishowen peninsula—in modern-day County Donegal—by the 12th century. Related dynasties descended through Conall Cremthainne and Diarmait mac Cerbaill included the Síl nÁedo Sláine, the kings of Brega, descended from Colmán Már's youngest brother Áed Sláine and the Kings of Uisnech, among others, belonging to Clann Cholmáin.

Through the common ancestry of Lóegaire mac Néill, the O'Conlons are also related to the O'Connell family, including Count Daniel Charles O'Connell, Eibhlín Dubh Ní Chonaill and the O'Connell Baronets.

Several prominent figures originating from the Tir Conail kingdom included Maximilian, Count von Tyrconnell.

== People ==
Other people from the Conlon family include:

- Barry Conlon (born 1978), Irish football player
- Charles M. Conlon (1868–1945), American photographer
- David Conlon (born 1982), Irish mathematician
- Edward Conlon (born 1965), a New York police officer and author
- Fred Conlon (1943–2005), an Irish sculptor
- Gerry Conlon (1954–2014), a member of the Guildford Four
- James Conlon (born 1950), an American conductor
- John Conlon (born 1989), hurler with Clonlara and Clare GAA
- Kelly Conlon (born 1969), an American bass guitarist
- Mary A. Conlon (1870–1936), an American elementary school principal who founded Walton High School
- Paddy Conlon (publican), the founder of the town of Narembeen in Western Australia
- Patrick Conlon (artist), an American tattooist and comics illustrator
- Patrick Conlon (politician) (born 1959), an Australian politician
- Patrick "Giuseppe" Conlon, a member of the Maguire Seven
- P. J. Conlon (born 1993), Irish-American baseball player
- Paul Conlon (rugby league) (born 1966), Australian former professional rugby league footballer
- Paul Conlon (footballer) (born 1978), English former footballer
- Peter Conlon, American politician
- Richard Conlon (born 1965 in Hemel Hempstead), is an English playwright
- Robert Daniel Conlon (born 1948), U.S. Catholic bishop
- Sarah Conlon (1926–2008), Irish activist
- Sean Conlon (born 1981), singer-songwriter
- Spot Conlon, a fictional character in the 1992 film Newsies, based on an actual person who was quoted in regards to the New York Newsies Strike of 1899.
- Tim Conlon (disambiguation), multiple people
- Tom Conlon (born 1996), English footballer
- Vera Conlon (1906–1994), British archaeological photographer
- Conlon Nancarrow (1912–1997), an American composer who took Mexican citizenship in 1955
- Thomas Connellan (1640–1698), Irish composer
- Mary Connellan, (fl. c. 1720), harpist
- William Connellan (fl. mid-17th century, brother of Thomas), Irish harpist
- Lawrence O'Connellan (fl. 1756), Irish Dominican Superior of Louvain, from County Sligo
- Thady Connellan (1780–1854), Irish teacher and scholar
- Owen Connellan (1797–1871), Irish historian
- Thomas Connellan (priest) (1855–about 1920), Irish priest
- Edward Connellan (1912–1983), Australian aviator; founder of Connellan Airways
- Leo Connellan (poet) (1928–2001), American poet
- Joe Connellan (died 1967), Irish newspaper editor and politician
- Ray Connellan, Irish sportsperson
- Marie Christine Conlon (born 1985), American Graphic Designer and Illustrator

== Bibliography ==
- Byrne, F. J. (1987). Irish kings and high-kings. London: Batsford. ISBN 0-7134-5813-5. OCLC 17430353.
- "Meath-county Tartan - Kinloch Anderson". www.kinlochanderson.com. Retrieved 2021-10-04
- Bell, Robert (2021). The book of Ulster surnames. Newtownards: Ulster Historical Foundation. ISBN 978-1-913993-38-2. OCLC 1302108307.
- The O Clery Book of Genealogies, Seamus Pender (ed.), in Analecta Hibernica, No. 18, 1951 pp. 1–198
- Burke, Bernard and Ashworth Peter Burke, A Genealogical and Heraldic History of the Landed Gentry of Ireland. London: Harrison & Sons. 9th edition, 1899.
- Marquis de Ruvigny, Melville H., The Nobilities of Europe. London: Melville and Company. 1910. (repr. Adamant Media Corporation, 2000

== Other ==
- Conlon v Ozolins, a New Zealand court case

== See also ==
- Irish nobility
- Irish kingdoms / kings
