= Kinlen =

Kinlen is an Irish surname, a variant of Ó Caoindealbháin, Ó Caoinleáin, Ó Conalláin, Conlon, Connellan, Quinlan and Quinlivan.

== Notable people with this name include ==
- Dermot Kinlen, Irish Inspector of Prisons
- Leo Kinlen, British cancer researcher
- John Kinlen murdered in 1816 in Firhouse, Ireland
