= Quinlivan =

Quinlivan is a surname of Irish origin.

== History ==
Irish surnames are mostly based on the Gaelic language native to Ireland. The original Gaelic form of the name Quinlivan is Ó Caoinleain or Ó Caoindealbhain. Spelling variations of this family name include: Quinlan, O'Quinlan, O'Quinlevan, O'Quinlivan and many more. First found in County Meath, where the family name has held a family seat from very ancient times.
In the province Leinster Quinlivan was usually anglicised as Kindellan and has now been absorbed into the more common forms of Connellan or Conlan. They were of distinguished origin, being of the southern Uí Néill and the senior line of the descendants of Lóegaire mac Néill, King of Tara during the time of Saint Patrick. The sept were originally to be found in Meath (pronounced Mee), but their numbers were greatly reduced by the Anglo-Norman invasion, but they remained in that area until the defeat of James II. In that time the form of the name used in Meath was Kindellan, a name which has been retained in Spain where many members of the sept settled in exile.

The branch of the family which settled in northern Tipperary were known as Quinlan in English. In the 1659 census they were noted as being one of the most numerous families in County Tipperary. The name is now almost confined to Munster, particularly counties Cork, Limerick and Tipperary. The variant spelling of "Quinlivan" is most associated with County Clare, as evidenced by the 13 births recorded there in the 1890 index. "Quinlin" was given as a principal name of Tipperary in the census of 1659, and Quinlan remained as the favored spelling of the name in 1890 with counties Tipperary and Kerry being centers for the name at that time. Kindlon is also said to be a variant spelling of the name in County Louth.

Some of the first settlers to America of this family name or some of its variants were:

- John Quinlan
- Mary Quinland and her husband settled in Charleston in 1803;
- James, John, Mary, Michael, Patrick, Thomas and William Quinlan all arrived in Philadelphia between 1800 and 1840.

== People ==
- Charles Quinlivan, born in Jersey City, New Jersey, actor, starred in Seven Guns to Mesa.
- Nessan Quinlivan, a Provisional IRA volunteer, escaped from British custody in Brixton Prison in 1991, while awaiting trial on charges relating to a suspected Provisional IRA plot to murder a former brewery company chairman, Sir Charles Tidbury.
- Maurice Quinlivan, a Sinn Féin Limerick city councillor, is the brother of Nessan Quinlivan.
- Hannah Quinlivan, born to an Australian father and Taiwanese-Korean mother, is a model and actress.
- Deah Quinlivan, PH.D., Associate Professor of Psychology at Florida Southern College

== Fiction ==
- Mr. Quinlivan: Frank McCourt's novel Angela's Ashes

== Tradition ==
Quinlivan Coat of Arms

- The Shield is: "Per pale ermine" or, two lions rampant combatant between a mullet surmounted of a crescent in chief and a dexter hand couped at the wrist and erect in base all gules.
- The Crest is: A stork azure pierced through the body with an arrow argent.
- The motto is: "True to the End."
- The Translation is: Statue (from the Irish word "Dealbh") which can mean "Role Model/s"
