= Paul Conlon =

Paul Conlon may refer to:

- Paul Conlon (rugby league)
- Paul Conlon (footballer)
- Paul Conlon (Gaelic footballer)
