= Connellan =

Connellan is a surname of Irish origin, a translation of ancient Irish names such as Ó Coinnialláin, Ó Coinndealbhán and others. These old Irish names were also translated as Conlon, Conlan, Conlin, etc., and were mainly found in the counties Sligo, Louth (where they were chieftains in Dundalk before the Norman invasion), Monaghan, Tyrone (from where their descendants moved to other counties), Ennis in County Clare from which many Connellans emigrated in the late 1800s and early 1900s to New York State in America, Roscommon and Kildare.

The name may refer to:

- Thomas Connellan (1640–1698), Irish composer
- William Connellan (fl. mid-17th century), Irish harpist, brother of Thomas
- Thady Connellan (1780–1854), Irish teacher and scholar
- Owen Connellan (1797–1871), Irish historian
- Thomas Connellan (priest) (1855–c. 1920), Irish priest
- Edward Connellan (1912–1983), Australian aviator; founder of Connellan Airways
- Leo Connellan (poet) (1928–2001), American poet
- Joe Connellan (died 1967), Irish newspaper editor and politician
- Ray Connellan, Irish sportsperson

== See also ==
- Conlan
- Conlon
