= Conlan =

Conlan is a surname of Irish origin, meaning hero. In its original Gaelic form it was spelt in a number of ways, resulting in many English-language versions, such as Conlon, Connellan, etc.

The O'Connellans were chiefs of Crioch Tullach, in County Tyrone. O'Conalláin (O'Connellan or O'Kendellan) were princes of Ui Laeghari or "Ive-Leary" in the tenth and eleventh centuries, an extensive territory in the counties of Meath and Westmeath (O'Coindealbhain, O'Connialláin, O'Connolláin, O'Connellan). Branches of this family in the twelfth and thirteenth centuries settled in the counties of Roscommon, Galway and Mayo.

Notable people with the surname include:

- Bernard Conlan (1923–2013), British Labour Party politician
- Craig Conlan, Scottish comics writer and artist
- Dennis Conlan (1838–1870), American Civil War soldier
- Greg Conlan (born 1963), Australian football player
- Jason Conlan (born 1971), New Zealand cartoonist
- Jocko Conlan (1899–1989), American baseball umpire
- John Bertrand Conlan (1930–2021), American lawyer and Republican politician, son of Jocko
- John Conlan (Kildare politician), Irish politician and farmer
- John Conlan (Monaghan politician) (1928–2004), Irish Fine Gael politician, grocer and publican
- Joseph Conlan, American film score composer
- Martin E. Conlan (1849–1923), American politician from South Dakota
- Matthew Conlan (hurler), (born 1993) Irish hurler
- Matt Conlan, Australian politician
- Michael Conlan (boxer) (born 1991), Irish boxer
- Michael Conlan (footballer) (born 1958), Australian football player, son of Neil
- Neil Conlan (1936–1978), Australian football player
- Shane Conlan (born 1964), American football player

Fictional characters:

- Molly Conlan McKinnon, from the CBS Soap As The World Turns
- "Pretty" Ricky Conlan, the main antagonist in Creed

== See also ==
- Connellan
- Conlon
