= Alcohol in association football =

Aspect of culture in sports

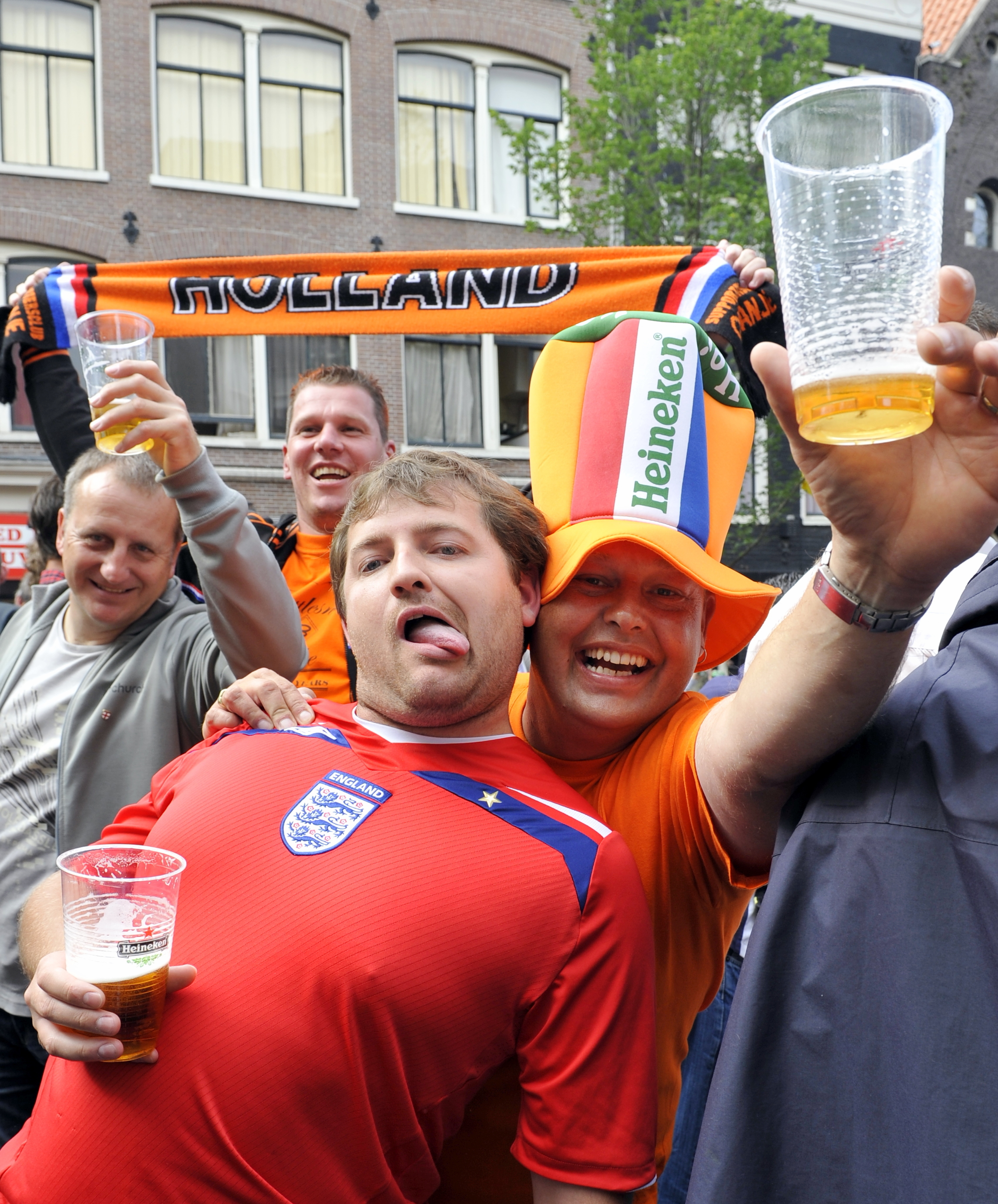
English and Dutch football fans drinking together in 2009

Alcohol companies are sponsors of major association football teams and tournaments. Branding has been voluntarily removed from children's replica kits and banned outright in France. Alcohol cannot be consumed in parts of English football grounds with view of the pitch, or anywhere in Scottish grounds outside of corporate hospitality.

In England, football had a drinking culture, which declined from the late 1990s due to foreign managers such as Arsène Wenger and an increased focus on health and fitness. Some footballers have suffered from alcohol abuse including cases in which it was as a factor in their deaths, and others have committed alcohol-related crimes such as drink-driving. Conversely, other players abstain from alcohol, including for reasons of faith.

== Alcohol and players ==
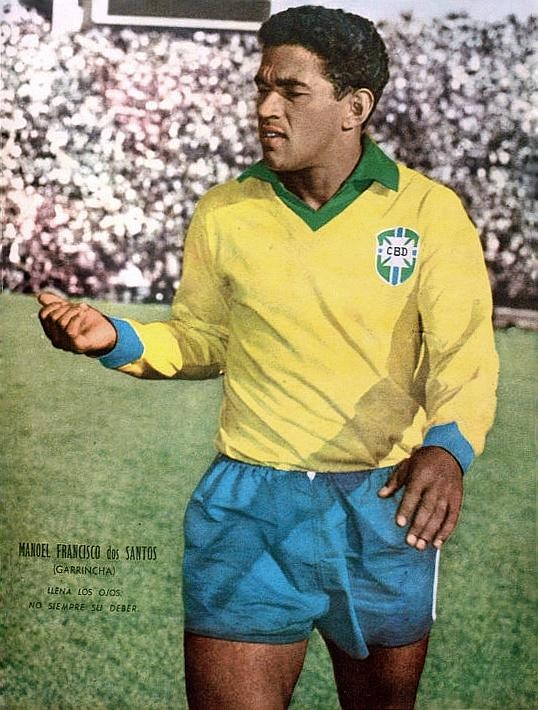
Two-time FIFA World Cup winner Garrincha died at the age of 49 due to alcohol abuse.

Arsenal's Tuesday Club has been cited as an example of drinking culture in English football. A manager associated with changing attitudes toward alcohol and fitness was Frenchman Arsène Wenger, who was hired by Arsenal in 1996. In 2003, Wenger picked 19-year-old Jermaine Pennant to play against Southampton; Pennant had not expected to play, but despite still being hungover after arriving home from a night out at 6 a.m., he scored a hat-trick as Arsenal won 6–1. In 2016, Wenger said that there was no longer a drinking culture in English football as players were aware of the risks.

According to Chelsea player Damien Duff, a strong drinking culture existed at the club during the early years of José Mourinho's tenure as manager, and that John Terry, Frank Lampard, Wayne Bridge, Eiður Guðjohnsen and Duff would go "out all the time and get absolutely lamped".

Former Liverpool and Tottenham Hotspur player, Paul Walsh was part of a drinking culture during his time at the clubs. He said that while with Tottenham he frequently drove when drunk and drank heavily while struggling with his performances.

In 2019, Rio Ferdinand said that he had been part of a drinking culture during his time at West Ham United and that he could not remember his performances in certain games due to his drinking at the time.

Players whose deaths have been linked to chronic alcohol abuse include Northern Irishman George Best (59) and Brazilian Garrincha (49). Players who had long-term issues with alcohol include Tony Adams, Paul Merson, Paul Gascoigne, Neil Ruddock, Gary Charles, Jimmy Greaves Brian Clough, Paul McGrath, Malcolm Macdonald, Brian McDermott and Kenny Sansom.

In 2020, Peter Whittingham died after falling during an incident at a pub in Barry, Vale of Glamorgan while intoxicated, as he lost his balance, walked through a fire door and fell down eight steps and hit his head.

=== Footballers and alcohol related crime ===
Footballers convicted of violent crime after drinking alcohol include Lee Bowyer, Chris Bettney, Kevin Hird, Marlon King, Adam Hammill, Josh Payne, Anthony Stokes, James Tomkins, Shaun Newton, Paul Conlon (manslaughter) and Marcus Maddison.

In January 2020, Jordan Sinnott was left with a fractured skull after a fight in Retford, Nottinghamshire. In July 2020, two men, Kai Denovan and Cameron Matthews, were jailed for manslaughter for their part in the "violent, drunken attack" that killed Sinnott. Denovan was jailed for eleven years and Matthews for eight years and three months.

=== Drink driving ===
Footballers convicted of drink driving include Paul Ince, Bobby Moore, Yaya Touré, Wayne Rooney, Craig Bellamy, Charlie Adam, Hugo Lloris, Jesse Lingard, Roberto Firmino, Danny Drinkwater, Trevor Sinclair, Joelinton, Mikel John Obi, Danny Graham, Peter Shilton, Tomáš Řepka, Ray Wilkins, Jermaine Pennant, Paul Merson Oli McBurnie, David Bentley, Barry Bannan, Fabian Delph, Nile Ranger, Chris Eagles, Jean-Philippe Gbamin, James Beattie, Alexandro Bernabei, Stephen Hughes, Callum McGregor, Michael O’Neill, Leighton James, Alex Bone, Manuel da Costa, Shane Duffy, James Hurst, Jenna Dear, Ilmari Niskanen and Courtney Meppen-Walter.

In 2018, Darron Gibson was found guilty of drink-driving for a second time having previously been convicted in 2015. Gibson who hit parked cars on his way to training with his club Sunderland was found to be three times over the drink-driving limit. Sunderland terminated his contract after he was charged.

==== Drink driving related deaths ====
In August 2003, Jimmy Davis was killed on the M40 motorway in Oxfordshire when he crashed into the back of a 32-tonne articulated lorry. He was twice the legal drink-drive limit.

In 2008, goalkeeper Luke McCormick was jailed for seven years and four months after admitting killing two young brothers on the M6 motorway while driving dangerously at twice the legal alcohol limit.

In May 2018, Jlloyd Samuel collided with a van while driving a Range Rover in Cheshire. The car burst into flames and Samuel died at the scene of the accident. An inquest found that Samuel had been twice the drink-driving limit and that his car had strayed onto the wrong side of the road, causing a head-on collision.

=== Muslim footballers and alcohol ===
Many Muslim footballers abstain from alcohol for religious reasons and it was reported in 2013 that celebrations have been altered to avoid exposing them to alcohol.

Footballers from Muslim backgrounds who have been convicted of drink-driving include Yaya Touré and Hamza Choudhury.

=== Footballers who abstain from alcohol ===
Footballers reported to abstain from alcohol include Cristiano Ronaldo, Gareth Bale, Jermain Defoe, Harry Kane and Lou Macari.

=== Football and alcohol-related illness ===
In 1932, West Ham United manager Syd King was dismissed after arriving drunk at a board meeting. In 1933, shortly after the sacking, he committed suicide by drinking alcohol mixed with a corrosive liquid.

Following his retirement in 2008, Claus Lundekvam revealed that he had problems with depression, drugs and alcohol after his playing career. About his addiction he said: "I would drink 2 litres (0.44 imp gal) of hard liquor and do between five and ten grams of cocaine every day". Lundekvam got help to overcome his addiction and issues at Sporting Chance Clinic, a recovery facility for athletes set up by former Arsenal captain Tony Adams.

In March 2021, Lee Collins died by suicide in a hotel room. At an inquest the coroner recorded a verdict of suicide. It was heard during the inquest that Collins had been drinking heavily every day for the past decade, and had been under the influence of alcohol and cocaine at the time of his suicide.

In 2022, Joey Beauchamp died by suicide after reportedly experiencing depression, alcohol addiction and financial difficulties.

== Alcohol and fans ==
In 1985, the consumption of alcohol in the stands of English football grounds and stadium areas with views of the pitch was banned in order to curb hooliganism. It was also banned on buses and trains taking supporters to games. This applies in the highest five tiers (Premier League to National League). In 2021, former sports minister Tracey Crouch considered changes to this rule, believing that it encouraged fans to drink quickly at half time. The idea was criticised by Mark Roberts, the police's leader on football.

Alcohol has been banned from any parts of Scottish football grounds since unrest at the 1980 Scottish Cup final between Celtic and Rangers, excluding corporate hospitality areas. There was talk on revoking this ban for UEFA Euro 2020, which was opposed by the police.

In 2012, Sheffield Wednesday goalkeeper Chris Kirkland was assaulted by an intoxicated Leeds United supporter who ran onto the pitch. At his prosecution, the court were told the fan had drunk a number of cans of lager and 0.75 litres (0.16 imp gal) of vodka before arriving in Sheffield followed by a further 7–10 pints of cider. He received a 16-week jail sentence and a six-year football banning order.

== Sponsorship ==
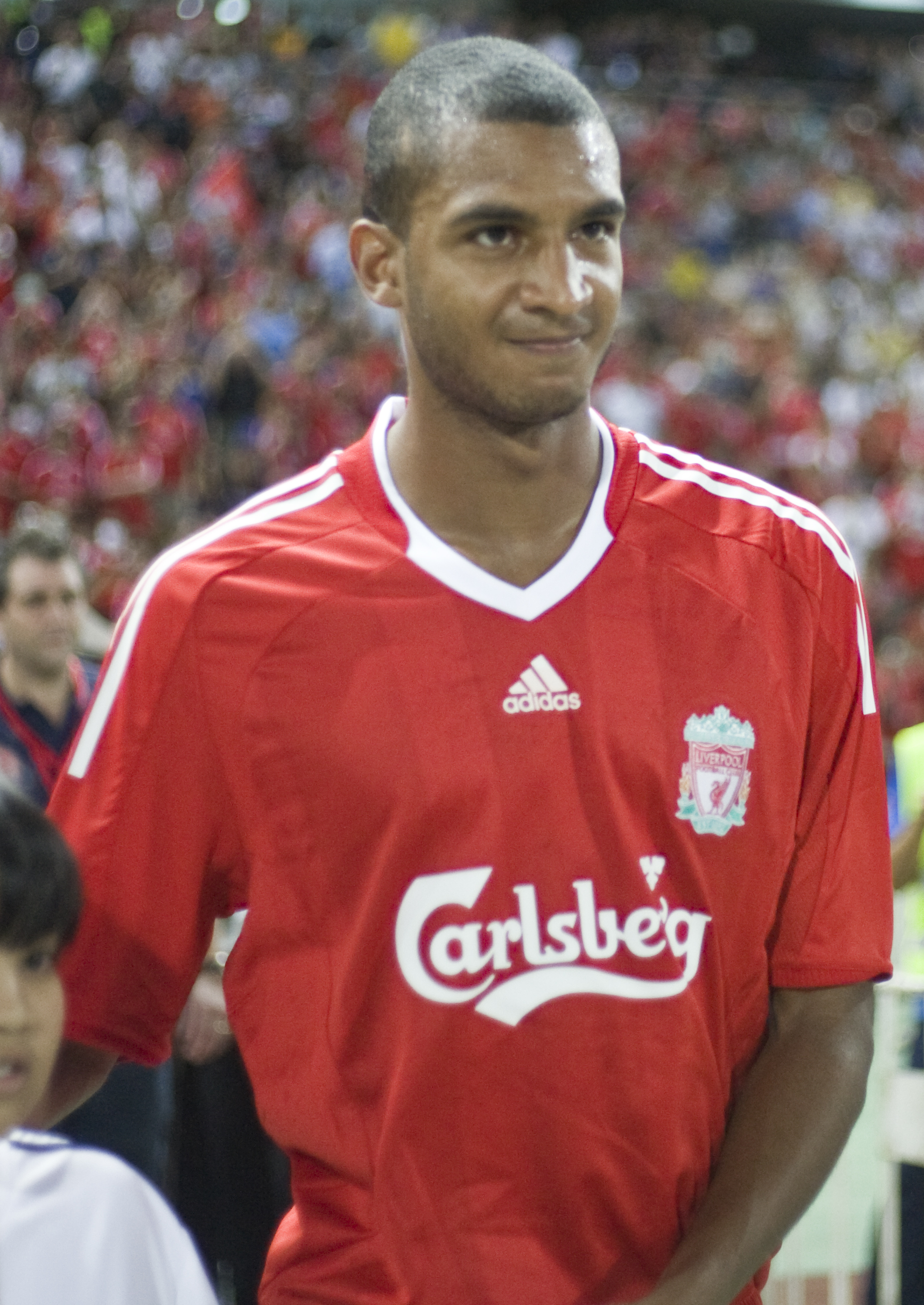
Liverpool's David Ngog in a Carlsberg-sponsored shirt in 2009

English football clubs sponsored by alcohol include Liverpool with Carlsberg (1992–2010), Newcastle United by Scottish & Newcastle (1980–2000), and Everton by Chang Beer (2004–2017). By the 2017–18 season, there were no longer any alcohol sponsors on shirts in the Premier League for the first time, as gambling companies predominated. In Scotland, rivals Celtic and Rangers shared Carling (2003–2010) and Tennent's (2010–2013) as sponsors before moving onto Magners and Blackthorn Cider, respectively. The rationale to sponsor both clubs was to avoid a boycott by fans of the rival team.

English tournaments with alcohol sponsorships include the Premier League by Carling (1993–2001), the FA Cup by Budweiser (2011–2014), and the EFL Cup by Worthington's (1998–2003) and Carling (2003–2012). In Scotland, such tournaments include the Scottish Cup by Tennent's (1989–2007) and the Scottish Football League by Bell's whisky (1994–1998; 1999–2006)

In June 2007, the Portman Group, representing Britain's drinks industry, voluntarily agreed to remove alcohol sponsors from replica kits for children. Owing to concerns about alcohol, Carling removed their branding from children's Celtic and Rangers kits in 2008 ahead of a Scottish legal ban on alcohol adverts appearing on children's kits which came into force in 2009.

Since the passing of the Loi Évin in 1991, it is illegal in France to use sponsorship to promote alcohol. For this reason, visiting foreign teams have to remove alcohol branding from their kits. There exists a loophole by which the branding of alcohol companies is permitted if it is explicitly promoting a low-alcohol beer with an ABV of under 1.2%; Carlsberg was able to sponsor UEFA Euro 2016 in France for this reason. At UEFA Euro 2020, French player Paul Pogba removed a sponsored bottle of non-alcoholic Heineken during a press conference; organisers said they would avoid placing beer bottles in front of Muslim players such as Pogba.

In June 2019, North America's Major League Soccer allowed jersey and stadium sponsorship by liquor and gambling companies. As of November 2020, the only Central American countries banning the advertising of alcohol in sport were Costa Rica and Panama. A bill in Costa Rica then passed its first reading, prescribing a 6% tax on alcohol sponsorships, and ensuring that 20% of advertising fees would be spent on building and maintaining sports facilities.

In 2012, Spain banned sponsorship of alcohol with an ABV of 20% or higher, in sport. Alcohol with a lower ABV was allowed to continue advertising, as breweries invested in Spanish football, including investment at grassroots level: in 2017 they invested €60 million, with sponsorships potentially doubling or trebling that amount.

== See also ==
- Smoking in association football
