= Arista (honor society) =

American organization for high school academics

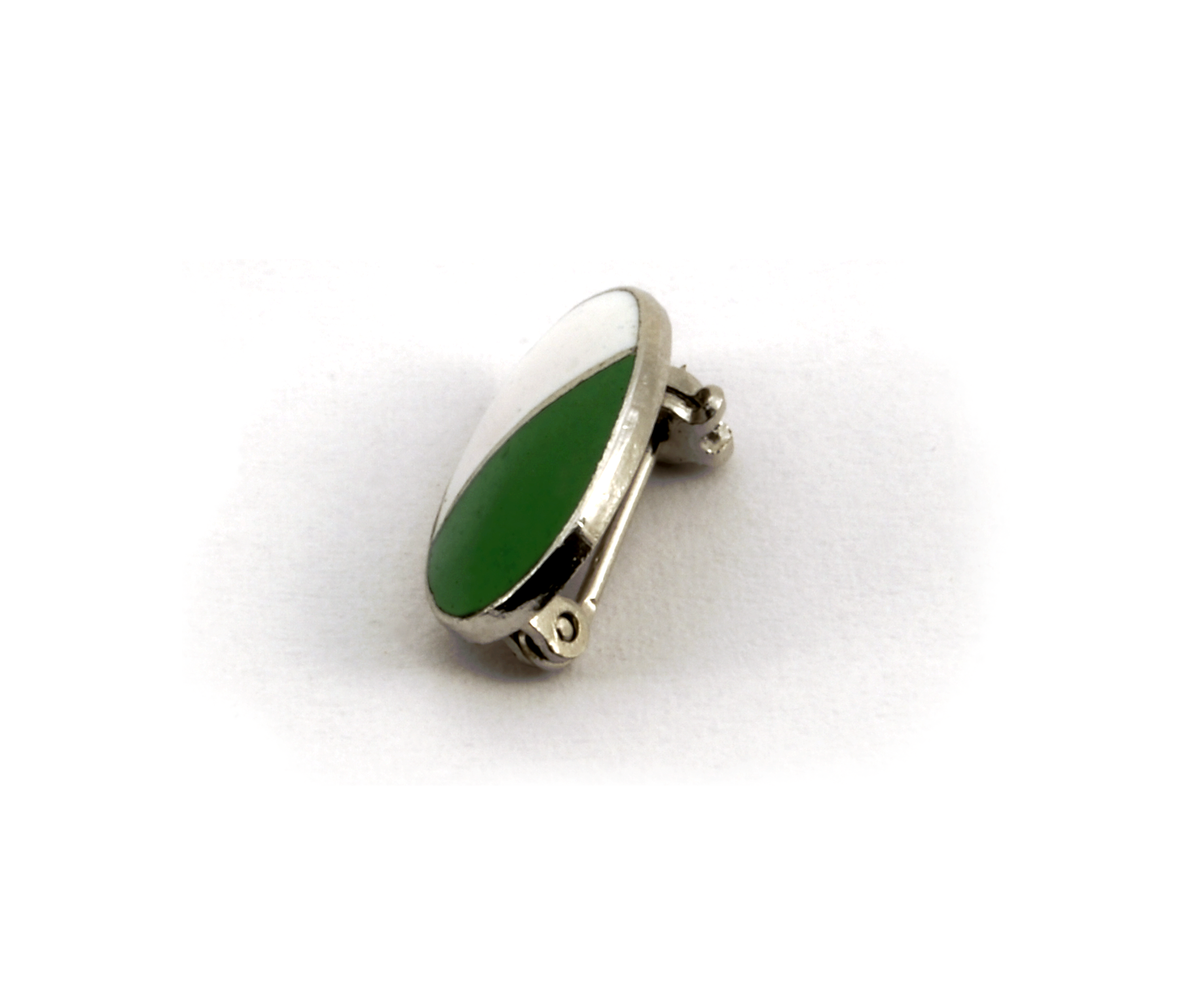
- Arista lapel pin, versioned for New Utrecht High School
- Founded: 1921; 105 years ago New York City
- Type: Honor
- Affiliation: Independent
- Status: Active
- Emphasis: High School
- Scope: Regional
- Pillars: Scholarship, Leadership, Service and Character
- Chapters: 18
- Headquarters: New York City, New York; United States

Arista is the New York City public school variant name for chapters of the National Honor Society (NHS). Arista began in 1921 and remained independent and active through the 1980s when nearly all schools converted into NHS chapters to avoid confusion on college applications. However, some chapters are still active as local honor societies and are not affiliated with the NHS.

== History ==
Arista began in 1921 in New York City public high and junior high schools as a variant of the National Honor Society (NHS). It remained independent and active through the 1980s when nearly all schools converted into NHS chapters, avoiding confusion on college applications.

As of 2018, several New York City high schools have Arista chapters. At least one chapter, upon discovering that they had been following the original Arista constitution and could not practically come into compliance with the NHS charter, chose to drop membership in the National Honor Society and continue as an independent Arista chapter.

Arista also has a junior honor society division that recognizes seventh and eighth-grade students.

== Symbols ==
The name Arista is derived from the Greek god Aristaeus and means "the best" or "most excellent".

The common insignia of the Arista chapters was an oval lapel pin, worn vertically and divided diagonally into the colors of the particular school. It is approximately 1/2 inch tall and 1/4 inch wide. Its pillars are scholarship, leadership, service, and character.

== Membership ==
High school students are admitted into Arista for excellence in academics, character, leadership, and service. Membership is open to juniors and seniors who have maintained an 85-grade average for three consecutive academic terms. Potential members must also complete fifty hours of community service. However, membership requirement vary between chapters.

Potential members of the junior division must complete ten hours of community service and have served in one leadership position, along with at least an 85-grade average.

== Chapters ==
Following is an incomplete list of Arista chapters.

Institution	Location	Status	References
Bell Academy	Bayside, Queens, New York City, New York	Active	(Note: This is a junior chapter.)
Benjamin N. Cardozo High School	Bayside, Queens, New York City, New York	Active	
Francis Lewis High School	Fresh Meadows, Queens, New York City, New York	Active	(Note: This is a chapter of the National Honor Society.)
George J. Ryan Middle School 216	Fresh Meadows, Queens, New York City, New York	Active	
George L. Egbert Intermediate School 2	Staten Island, New York City, New York	Active	
Health, Arts, Robotics, and Technology High School	Cambria Heights, Queens, New York City, New York	Active	
Horace Greeley Intermediate School 10 Q	Queens, New York City, New York	Active	
Jamaica High School	Jamaica, Queens, New York City, New York	Inactive	
Joseph B Cavallaro Intermediate School 281	Brooklyn, New York City, New York	Active	
John Bowne High School	Flushing, Queens, New York City, New York	Active	
Fiorello H. LaGuardia High School	Upper West Side, Manhattan, New York City, New York	Active	
Newtown High School	Elmhurst, Queens, New York City, New York	Active	
Richmond Hill High School	Richmond Hill, Queens, New York City, New York	Active	
Queens High School for the Sciences	Jamaica, Queens, New York City, New York	Active	
Queens Technical High School	Long Island City, Queens, New York City, New York	Active	
Stuyvesant High School	New York City, New York	Active	
Townsend Harris High School	Flushing, Queens, New York City, New York	Active	
Wagner Middle School	New York City, New York	Active	
Walton High School	Jerome Park, West Bronx, New York City, New York	Inactive	(Note: The school closed in June 2008.)

== Notable members ==
- Shirley Chisholm, the first black woman to be elected to the United States Congress
- Clive Davis, music executive and founder of Arista Records
- Richard Feynman, theoretical physicist
- Lucille Fletcher, dramatist
- David Sholtz, 26th Governor of Florida

== Legacy ==
Clive Davis, a member of Arista during his time at Erasmus Hall High School, repurposed the name as founder of Arista Records in 1974.
