= Smoking in association football =

Aspect of culture in sports

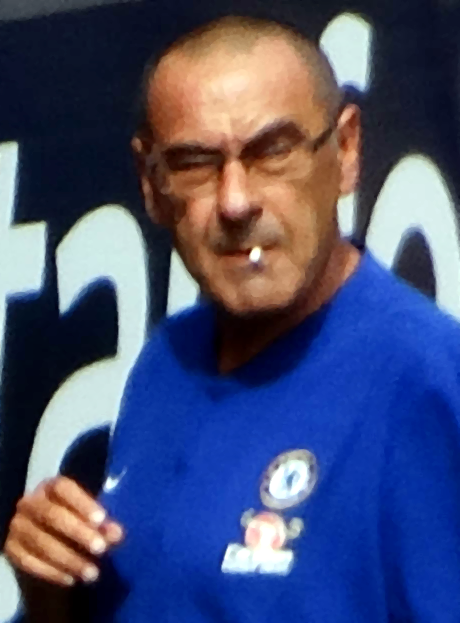
Chelsea manager and noted smoker Maurizio Sarri in 2018, chewing a cigarette butt during a Premier League match due to England's smoking ban

The issue of smoking in association football is a historical controversy. Traditionally, football managers would smoke on the touch-line as well as players smoking away from the pitch. However, increasing public health concerns and stricter regulations have led to widespread smoking restrictions in football. Smoking is now largely banned from stadiums around the world, but some individual players and managers have continued to smoke.

== History ==
In the early 20th century, smoking among players and coaches was common in professional football. In the 1930s, top footballers in England were used to promote cigarette brands as players often smoked. Cigarette cards were collectible cards from cigarette packets, of which images of footballers were a popular variety. Bobby Robson was among the first players to assert his image rights, receiving three guineas for his image on cigarette cards. Through cigarette advertising, Sir Stanley Matthews became aware of emerging scientific research linking smoking to cancer. Some managers at the time also would not allow smoking around their players, with the Arsenal manager Herbert Chapman asking players if they smoked or drank alcohol before attempting to sign them and the Wolverhampton Wanderers manager Frank Buckley issuing club rules prohibiting players from smoking for two days prior to a match.

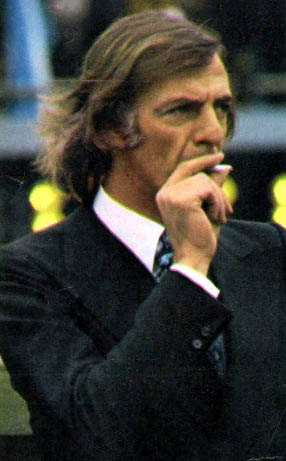
César Luis Menotti at the 1978 FIFA World Cup

After World War II, prominent footballers like Jack Charlton, Johan Cruyff, Preben Elkjær and Sócrates were known to smoke. In the 1950s, when Wilf McGuinness became a reserve team manager at Manchester United, where he managed players he had played with, he was encouraged to start smoking as a way to assert his authority as a manager.

== Bans ==
Growing opposition to smoking led to governing bodies placing restrictions on smoking around football. In 1985, following the Bradford City stadium fire which was attributed to a discarded cigarette setting accumulated litter alight, The Football Association banned smoking in all wooden stands in England. A 1986 academic paper discovered that only 5% of professional footballers smoked. In 2002, FIFA introduced a smoking ban for stadiums during the 2002 FIFA World Cup; however, this complete ban was later dropped for the 2006 FIFA World Cup. Despite this, a ban on smoking on the touchline during the tournament was still enforced with the Mexico national football team manager Ricardo La Volpe receiving an official warning for smoking during his team's group stage match against the Iran national football team.

In 2003 UEFA announced that during European competitions from the 2004–05 season, smoking would be banned from the touchline and technical areas but would be allowed inside the dressing room where local laws permitted. The AC Milan manager Carlo Ancelotti was reprimanded for breaking this rule in 2007 for smoking during Milan's UEFA Champions League match against Celtic at Celtic Park. In 2010, as part of their stadium code of conduct, FIFA banned smoking in all areas of stadiums being used in their competitions. Smoking is banned from stadiums in Mexico and the Tigres UANL manager Ricardo Ferretti was banned for one match after smoking on the substitutes bench during their match against Santos Laguna in 2021.

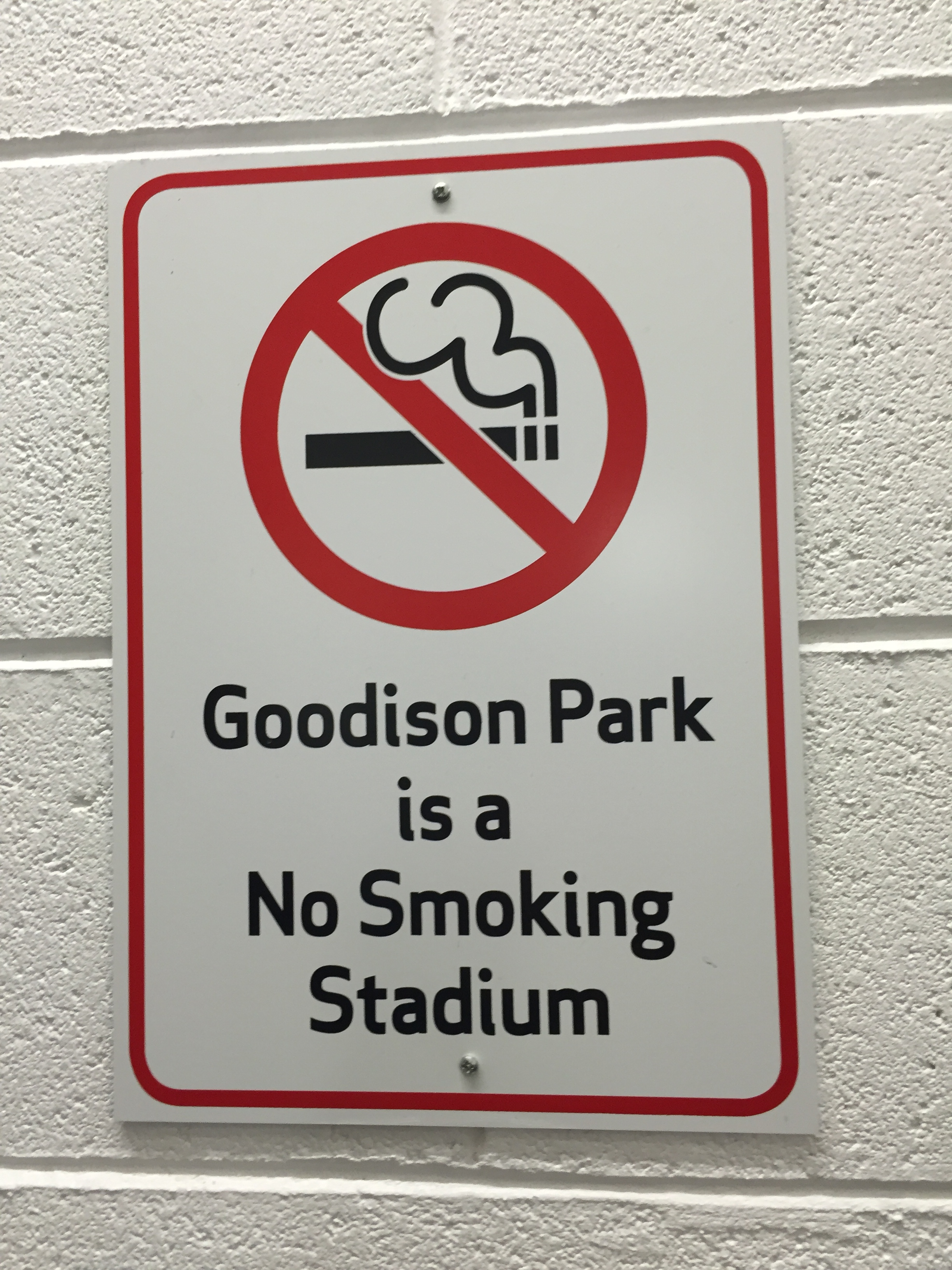
Goodison Park was the first smoke-free stadium in England.

In England, clubs also started to ban smoking from several areas in their grounds. In 2005, Everton announced that Goodison Park would become a no-smoking stadium with a total ban on smoking anywhere in the ground, the first in England. Other grounds followed suit with the City of Manchester Stadium and Sunderland's Stadium of Light banning smoking by 2006. In Wales, the Millennium Stadium introduced a smoking ban in 2006 following encouragement from the Welsh Government. In Northern Ireland, in 2007 the Irish Football Association banned smoking from all Northern Ireland national football team matches at Windsor Park.

In 2011, Spain banned smoking indoors in all stadiums. However, players and spectators were still permitted to smoke in outdoor areas of stadiums. Individual clubs, such as Barcelona instituted separate complete bans on smoking anywhere within their grounds. Real Madrid continued to allow smoking at the Santiago Bernabéu Stadium but they announced in 2019 that once they had completed renovations of the stadium, smoking would be banned. In the same year, Argentina passed legislation banning smoking in several public places but smoking in football stadiums was specifically excluded from this ban. Brazil passed a similar law excluding football stadiums from stricter smoking restrictions in 2014. In 2013, Slaven Bilić then manager of Turkish team Beşiktaş, was given a warning by the Turkish Football Federation. Having been photographed while smoking watching a Galatasaray versus Gaziantepspor game at the Türk Telekom Arena, Bilic was told that a further transgression would result in a fine.

France banned smoking from the touchline in 2014. In 2018, the Russian Football Union instituted a rule prohibiting Russia national football team players from smoking at the 2018 FIFA World Cup. The decision aligned with Russian public health policies, with President of Russia Vladimir Putin publicly advocating for reduced smoking among fans. In 2021, Paraguay banned smoking in all crowded public areas.

== Post-bans ==
Despite the bans into the 21st century, some footballers and managers continued to smoke. In 2004, Joey Barton stubbed out a cigar in the eye of his Manchester City teammate Jamie Tandy and was sued successfully for £65,000. The French player Zinedine Zidane was hired by the European Union to front their anti-smoking campaign in 2002 but was later seen in 2006 smoking. The Italian manager, Maurizio Sarri would regularly smoke with Napoli and RB Leipzig building concrete sheds on the touchline so he could legally smoke. When he became manager of Chelsea in England where smoking is banned indoors, he started to chew on cigarette butts. The Germany national football team manager Joachim Löw received criticism from the German press after being filmed smoking in a spectator box for the UEFA Euro 2008 quarter-final when he was serving a touchline ban. Löw responded by saying: "What should I say about it? It is my private thing. I am just human, with strengths and weaknesses. I smoke a cigarette sometimes, or drink a glass of red wine in the evening. It is not as if I am a hedonist." The Danish striker Nicklas Bendtner attested that on his first day at Juventus in Italy, he found his teammates Gianluigi Buffon and Andrea Pirlo smoking in a toilet.

In the 2010s, a number of football managers enforced an anti-smoking ethos in their clubs. Arsenal manager Arsène Wenger, who used to smoke on the touchline as manager of Monaco and used to sell cigarettes before entering football, criticised Jack Wilshere in 2013 after Wilshere was filmed smoking. He also issued a £20,000 fine to goalkeeper Wojciech Szczęsny for smoking in the Emirates Stadium dressing room. Guus Hiddink was fined when he was manager of Chelsea after being filmed smoking a cigar in the Wembley Stadium dressing rooms following Chelsea's win in the 2009 FA Cup Final.

Former smoking football players and coaches later came to express dissent against smoking. Cruyff, who had stopped smoking in 1991 due to heart problems and promoted anti-smoking campaigns subsequently, was diagnosed with lung cancer in 2015 which had been linked to his smoking during his playing career. In 2004, Sócrates pulled out of a match after 20 minutes whilst playing for the English non-league Garforth Town on the grounds that he had smoked too many cigarettes in order to continue. In the days leading up to his passing in 2020, Diego Maradona was filmed smoking while appearing visibly unwell.

Premier League regulations prohibit vaping inside stadiums, although rules may vary for designated outdoor areas. As it is not banned by the law, English Football League and Scottish Premiership grounds have permitted spectators to vape, and have allowed vaping companies to sell products inside. In 2022, Blackburn Rovers signed a sponsorship deal with a local vaping company. According to FA rules, sponsorship related to vaping cannot appear on youth kits. These same rules exist for alcohol or gambling, while tobacco sponsorship is banned on both adult and youth kits.

== See also ==
- Alcohol in association football
