= All the Young Men =

1960 film by Hall Barlett

- 1960 theatrical poster
- Directed by: Hall Bartlett
- Written by: Hall Bartlett
- Produced by: Hall Bartlett
- Starring: Alan Ladd; Sidney Poitier; James Darren; Glenn Corbett; Mort Sahl; Ana St. Clair; Ingemar Johansson
- Cinematography: Daniel L. Fapp
- Edited by: Al Clark
- Music by: George Duning
- Production companies: Jaguar Productions; Ladd Enterprises
- Distributed by: Columbia Pictures
- Release date: August 26, 1960
- Running time: 86 minutes
- Country: United States
- Language: English
- Budget: over $1 million
- Box office: $2,000,000 (US/ Canada)

All the Young Men is a 1960 American Korean War feature film directed by Hall Bartlett and starring Alan Ladd and Sidney Poitier dealing with desegregation in the United States Marine Corps. Poitier plays a sergeant unexpectedly placed in command of the survivors of a platoon in the Korean War. The film explores the racial integration of the American military, centering on the African-American sergeant's struggle to win the trust and respect of the men in his unit.

== Plot ==
When a lieutenant is mortally wounded in a winter ambush that decimates his platoon, he passes command to the highest ranking survivor, Sergeant Towler, a black man. However, all of the other men left alive are white. Towler feels that Private Kincaid, an ex-sergeant with 11 years of experience (demoted for doing things his way), is better suited for command, but the lieutenant orders him to take charge and complete their vital mission: to take and hold a farmhouse strategically positioned in a mountain pass for the advance of their battalion. After the lieutenant dies, Southerner Private Bracken initially refuses to take orders from Towler, but Towler forces him, at gunpoint, to back down.

With their radio not working, Towler leads ten healthy survivors and a badly wounded Private Casey on a stretcher to their objective. As they warily approach the farmhouse, one soldier spots someone inside and throws a grenade, which wounds a Korean woman. The only other occupants are her young son and her adult, part-French daughter Maya. Kincaid and some of the others want to leave before the enemy attacks, but Towler keeps them there.

They repel an attack later that night. Hunter, a Navajo, volunteers to scout the area in place of Towler. They agree on a password. Hunter is captured, but despite being hit repeatedly, refuses to disclose the password when he is forced toward the outpost manned by Towler and Kincaid. After his challenges are not answered, Towler fires, striking Hunter and some enemy soldiers. After the enemy is repelled, Hunter gives the password. Towler and Kincaid find him, and he talks to Towler before dying.

Bracken tries to force himself on Maya. Her scream brings Towler, but Bracken ignores Towler's order to leave and strikes him. Towler knocks him down, but Bracken remains defiant.

Lazitech, manning the outpost, is the next casualty. At his own request, Casey is carried to a gunport to fight, but he dies in the next assault. Towler and Kincaid start brawling when Towler catches Kincaid slacking off afterward, but they break off when they hear a tank approaching. After driving off the accompanying infantrymen with a machine gun, Towler and Kincaid use kerosene and torches to set the tank on fire. When a tank man opens the hatch, Kincaid tosses in a grenade. The tank runs over his leg when he jumps off and Corpsman Wade has to amputate it, but the only man who has the right type of blood for a transfusion is Towler. The operation is a success despite Wade's lack of training.

When a column of tanks is spotted, Towler sends his men and the civilians up the pass while he goes back and carries Kincaid to the outpost. Friendly aircraft appear and bombard the enemy infantry as they advance, signaling the approach of the battalion.

== Cast ==
- Sidney Poitier as Sergeant Eddie Towler
- Alan Ladd as Private Kincaid
- James Darren as Private Cotton
- Glenn Corbett as Hospital Corpsman Wade
- Mort Sahl as Corporal Crane
- Ana María Lynch as Maya
- Paul Richards as Private Bracken
- Richard Davalos as Private Casey
- Lee Kinsolving as Private Dean
- Joseph Gallison as Private Jackson
- Paul Baxley as Private Lazitech
- Charles Quinlivan as Lieutenant Earl D. Toland
- Michael Davis as Cho
- Mario Alcalde as Hunter
- Maria Tsien as Korean Woman
- Ingemar Johansson as Private Torgil

== Production ==
Hall Bartlett designed the film as a vehicle for Sidney Poitier based on the integration of the military in the Korean War. Bartlett devised the original story with Gene Coon and wrote the script himself. He aimed to make the film independently, though the start date was dependent on Poitier's success in the play A Raisin in the Sun.

Columbia Pictures agreed to finance provided that Bartlett rewrite the script for a white costar. Bartlett found that the only major star willing take the role was Alan Ladd, who co-produced the film. Bartlett said:

I could have done it [the film] on a shoestring in some canyon in the Hollywood Hills, but I felt that now is the time for me to prove myself with a picture in the million-plus category. I realized that I could not stay in my ivory tower forever, making nice, small, critically praised films. You don't go very far here if you're not successful when the right time comes.

The film features an unusual cast; in addition to Ladd and Poitier, the cast includes comedian Mort Sahl, who does a comedy routine, James Darren, who sings the title song and boxer Ingemar Johansson in his American film debut. Bartlett cast his Argentine wife Ana María Lynch as a French Korean, Mario Alcalde as an American Indian, Hollywood-born Paul Richards as a bigoted Southerner and local Blackfoot Indians as North Koreans. "I just play myself", said Johansson.

All the Young Men was filmed in Glacier National Park in Montana and at Mount Hood, Oregon. Poitier's commitment to the film forced him leave the run of the play A Raisin in the Sun early.

Columbia planned two separate advertising campaigns for the film, one for white audiences and another for blacks. Columbia also used Quentin Reynolds to promote the film in advertising campaigns. Marvin Albert wrote a paperback novelization of the film.

The U.S. Marine Corps provided Lieutenant Colonel Clement J. Stadler, who had been awarded the Navy Cross in World War II as a technical advisor, a function that he also performed for Hell to Eternity, The Outsider, Ambush Bay and The Lieutenant television series. The Marines had begun disbanding separate black units and bases on November 18, 1949.

== Reception ==
New York Times critic Bosley Crowther wrote: "Racial integration in the United States Marines is sluggishly celebrated in a variation on a well-used Western plot in the picture that opened at the Forum yesterday."
