= Walton High School (Bronx) =

Public school in New York City

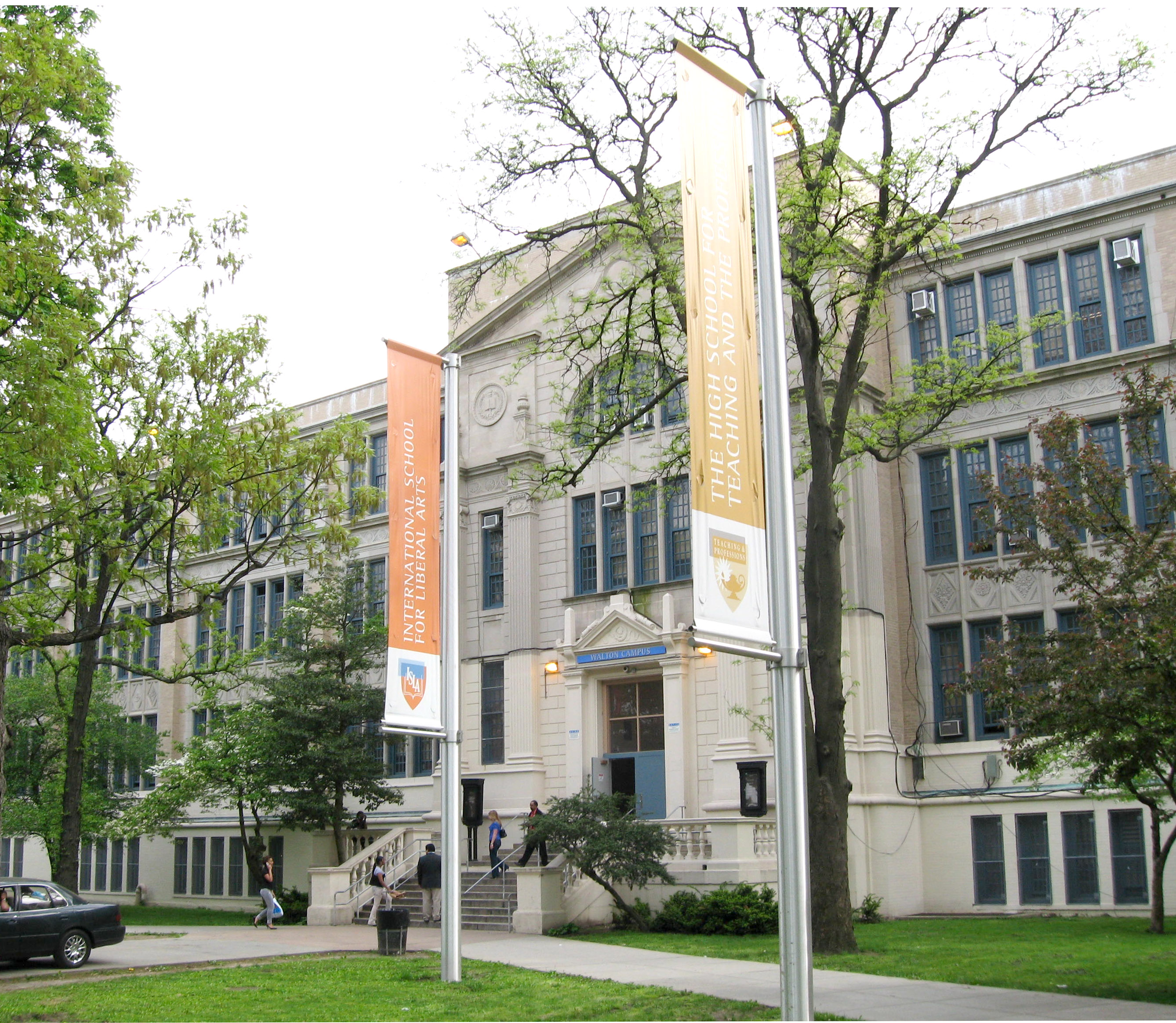

Location
- 2780 Reservoir Avenue; The Bronx, New York City, New York 10468; United States; 40°52′15″N 73°53′51″W

Information
- School type: Public, secondary
- Motto: Semper Fidelis (Latin for "always faithful")
- Established: 1923; 103 years ago
- Closed: June 2008; 18 years ago
- School district: New York City Public Schools (NYCPS)
- Principal: John Tornifolio
- Grades: 9–12
- Enrollment: 1,191 (2007–2008)
- Colors: Blue; White
- Mascot: Wildcats
- Yearbook: Periwinkle
- Website: waltonhs.com

Walton High School was a public four-year high school located in the Jerome Park neighborhood of the Bronx in New York City. Originally an all-girl institution, Walton became co-educational in 1977. Walton, Bayside High School, Samuel J. Tilden High School, Abraham Lincoln High School, John Adams High School, Andrew Jackson High School, and Grover Cleveland High School were all built during the Great Depression from one set of blueprints, to save money.

Walton's colors were sky blue and white. Its motto, Semper fidelis, means "always faithful". The school seal was an open book supported by the torch of learning, and the school crest contains the head of Athena, Greek goddess of wisdom. The wildcat was the mascot used by the Walton's sports teams. Today the sports teams are composed of the students of each of the small mini-schools within the Walton Educational Campus. The building is in the same neighborhood as the Bronx High School of Science and DeWitt Clinton High School. From the mid-1980s to its closing in 2008 it was one of the lower-performing high schools in the city. Walton was operated by the New York City Department of Education. The building now houses several mini-schools for academic support.

== History ==
Walton High School is named after Mary Walton, a wife of General Lewis Morris, a member of the Continental Congress and a signer of the Declaration of Independence and the U.S. Constitution, as well as one of the first members of New York State's Board of Regents. Mary Walton was the mother of ten children, four of whom fought in the American Revolutionary War. The Walton and the Morris families owned land in the west Bronx from the 17th until the 19th century. Mary Walton operated a "dame school", teaching little girls of the colonial period to read, write, do basic mathematics, and keep house. Mary Walton was buried next to Saint Ann's Church in the South Bronx. Mary A. Conlon, an elementary school principal of P.S. 30 (located next to Mary Walton's burial place), founded Walton as one of the first all-girl schools in New York City. The New York City Board of Education accredited Walton as an all-girl high school on April 19, 1923. The first graduation took place in January 1926 with 126 girls.

In 1930, the building on Jerome Avenue and West 195th Street was constructed as Walton's new home, using the same structural design as Abraham Lincoln High School and Samuel J. Tilden High School, both in Brooklyn. The school moved to its new home in 1932. Conlon continued as principal until her death in 1936, when Marion Cahil Heffernan (an assistant principal of economics at Erasmus Hall High School in Brooklyn) took over. By 1933, the student population had peaked at approximately 6,000. It was noted as the second-largest high school in the world behind its brother school, DeWitt Clinton. It was also noted that it was the largest high school in the world for girls. Walton was a prestigious all-girl institution throughout much of its history, with a high graduation rate. Its students were often inducted into the Arista honor society. Many of Walton's graduates went on to Ivy League colleges and universities. For many years the school's yearbook was named the Periwinkle, a small blue flower. With the change in demographics of the surrounding neighborhoods came the change in the overall level of excellence for which Walton had been known. The demise and eventual closing of this school saddened those who remembered Walton as it was.

In 1966, Heffernan retired after serving thirty years as principal. The school appointed its first male principal, Daniel Feins, the former assistant principal of social studies at Christopher Columbus High School. Walton continued as an all-girl school until 1976, when the administration elected to become a co-educational high school. On September 9, 1977, boys were officially admitted to the school; however, it would not be fully co-educational until 1979, when the final all-girl class graduated. In 1980, Marjorie Kipp was appointed as the new principal. Three years later, the school's pool was closed due to a deterioration from the skylight. In 1984, Phyllis Opochinsky founded the Pre-Teaching Academy (in which students work with other peers with classwork and homework, assist teachers in classrooms, write term papers on their experience in pre-teaching, and earn college credit through Lehman College). In 1986, Angel D. Orengo became the school's first male valedictorian.

In 1990, Kipp retired and a new principal, Nicola Genco (an assistant principal of guidance at Alfred E. Smith High School) was appointed. She addressed security issues, employed more than twenty school safety officers and helped gain funds for the school to be renovated. In 1994, the school's $54 million modernization was officially launched and completed in 1998. Genco also oversaw faculty turnover by terminating some teachers and hiring others she deemed more qualified. Programs such as the Pre-Teaching Academy and Humanities bolstered Walton's good reputation. Principal Genco and her administration implemented the Walton Plan to target lateness and loitering around campus, and to encourage the faculty to show interest in every student's progress.

In 1997, Walton was named a New American High School for serving as a model for schools nationwide that have achieved high levels of success. The next year, the School Construction Authority had declared the completion of Walton's renovation. Principal Genco was concerned that not all of the building's modernization were complete. She and the SCA held a meeting and the agency threatened to close the school down. Genco consulted the news media, such as WABC-TV, WNBC-TV, and the New York Daily News. She addressed issues like the peeling paint around the building, lack of heat, poor architecture, and the mismanagement of the pool. In 1999, the SCA agreed with Genco, shortly before her retirement, to repair the school's roof. In 2002, another principal persuaded the agency to modernize the exterior of the building which was completed in 2005. However, the swimming pool, with mini-columns and beautifully tiled, was never repaired despite the SCA contract. On April 19, 1998, Walton celebrated its 75th anniversary by throwing a birthday party inside the lunchroom and holding a luncheon at Maestro's Restaurant for all the graduating classes throughout the school's history. The Periwinkle (yearbook) also acknowledged the anniversary.

In 1999, Valerie Vallade, an alumna of Walton, was appointed as the sixth principal and increased the graduation rate. She retired in 2002, when Patricia Friedman (former Assistant Principal of English) was appointed as Interim Acting Principal. Truancy and unlawful activity increased. Allegedly, some faculty members berated Friedman for this and called for her resignation. A new principal, John Tornifolio, took over in 2004. In that year, Mayor Michael Bloomberg and the Department of Education labeled Walton as an "Impact School." More than twenty School Safety Officers were assigned and surveillance cameras were installed around campus. Walton High School faced a phase-out in 2005 because of overcrowding and criminal activity. Numerous advocates, such as the Walton High School Alumni Association, failed to persuade the New York City Department of Education to keep the school running. The school graduated its final class in June 2008.

=== Organizational houses ===
For many years, Walton was divided into eight theme houses:

- Apollo House
- Hercules House
- Jupiter House
- Mercury House
- Orion House (special education)
- Pre-Teaching House
- Ulysses House
- Welcome House (for incoming freshmen)

== Demographics ==
When Walton opened in 1923, the school was entirely White. When Mary A. Conlon died in 1936, the school was 80% White and 20% African-American. The June Class of 1938 yearbook, however, shows no black women in any of the group photos and only three among the photos of the graduating class. In the mid-1960s, Hispanic students started to enroll in sizable numbers, and by the end of the 1960s, Walton's ethnic makeup was 40% White, 40% African-American, and 20% Hispanic. The National Center for Education Statistics (NCES) code 362058002884 identifies this school.

== Academics ==
=== Programs for students ===
- Pre-Teaching Academy – Founded in 1984 by Phyllis Opochinsky, students work with other peers with classwork and homework, assist teachers in classrooms, write term papers on their experience in Pre-teaching, and earn college credit through Lehman College. All students must earn a grade of 80 (B) and above.
- Humanities – Students take interdisciplinary studies in the arts and history, and participate in cultural trips.
- Business – Computer training, accounting, resume preparation, pre co-op program, etc.
- Cooperative Education – Students work one week and attend school the next. It is often a paid internship, and students earn college credit.

=== Extracurricular activities ===
- Yearbook (Periwinkle) – Founded in 1926 when the first graduating class graduated from the school, the Periwinkle is one of the most unusual and distinct yearbooks in the United States.
- Performing arts – Only available to students assigned to Walton. It includes drama, vocal and instrumental music, and art.
- Cheerleading – Many students (male and female) are in the cheerleading squad. It has won six awards for six consecutive years, and championships.
- Football – Reinstated in 2001, it is not a major city PSAL sport like the other sports in Walton.
- Step-team
- Cross country
- Tennis
- Basketball
- Baseball
- Softball

=== Student support services ===
- SPARK – A citywide drug/sex prevention program open to students from all grade levels.
- PIUS XII/Good Shepherd Student Services – A community-based program designed for drop-out intervention. The program is conducted by Antonia Campopiano-Ferrara and was active in Walton since 1991.
- College Advisory – Provides resources for students who plan to enroll in a college or university.
- SBST (School-Based Support Team) – Provides personal and academic support to regular and special education students.

== Mini-schools inside the Walton Campus ==
- High School for Teaching and the Professions – Founded in 2002 from the Pre-Teaching Academy program of Walton, provides a smaller and friendlier environment to pupils.
- Discovery High School – Founded in 2003
- Celia Cruz Bronx High School of Music – Founded in 2003 inside DeWitt Clinton High School, is the official school for music and the arts of the Bronx. CCBxHSM was relocated to the Walton Campus, its current location, in 2004
- Kingsbridge International High School – Founded in September 2005 with only four classrooms in Walton, is the sister school of the successful International School in Queens. Like its other sister schools, Manhattan International and Bronx International, Kingsbridge was implemented to help new immigrants in New York learn English through various projects. Most of the students are new to this country and many have had their educational opportunity derailed due to poverty and lack of resources.
- International School for Liberal Arts is an intermediate school including 6th–12th grades. Most students in the school are Hispanics, predominantly Dominicans. Students are required to wear uniforms.

== Principals ==
- Mary A. Conlon (1923–1936)
- Marion Cahil Heffernan (1936–1966)
- Daniel M. Feins (1966–1980)
- Marjorie J. Baird (1980–1990)
- Nicola Provenzano-Genco (1990–1999)
- Valerie J. Vallade (1999–2002)
- Patricia Friedman (2002–2004)
- John Tornifolio (2004–2008)

== Notable alumni ==
- Bella Abzug (1920–1998), nicknamed "Battling Bella", lawyer, U.S. representative, social activist and leader in the women's movement
- Isabel Bigley (1926–2006), actress
- Coko (born 1970), singer-songwriter best known as the lead singer of the R&B vocal trio SWV
- Gertrude Elion (1918–1999), biochemist and pharmacologist, who shared the 1988 Nobel Prize in Physiology or Medicine
- Oswald Feliz, politician and attorney serving as a member of the New York City Council
- Shari Lewis (1933–1998), TV legend ventriloquist, puppeteer, children's entertainer, and television show host
- Leanne "Lelee" Lyons (born 1973), singer–songwriter and television personality; member of the R&B vocal trio SWV
- Penny Marshall (1943–2018), actress, director, and producer
- John Morton (born 1967), former all-New York State point guard, member of Seton Hall University's 1989 NCAA National Championship game; first-round pick by Cleveland in the NBA draft, also played in the CBA and in Europe and the Philippines; inducted into the New Jersey Sports Writers Association Hall of Fame in 2007; assistant coach at Fordham and Seton Hall
- Anna Jacobson Schwartz (1915–2012), economist at the National Bureau of Economic Research in New York City; writer for The New York Times
- Rosalyn Sussman Yalow (1921–2011), medical physicist, co-winner of the 1977 Nobel Prize in Physiology or Medicine
- Andrea Thomas (born 1968), ranked sprinter who set several national and New York State records in outdoor and indoor track; Jamaica Olympic team member in 1984 and 1988
