= Conlon v Ozolins =

- Court: New Zealand Court of Appeal
- Full case name: Luciza Ozolins v Bernard John Conlon
- Decided: 31 May 1984
- Citation: [1984] 1 NZLR 489
- Transcript: High Court judgment Court of Appeal judgment

Court membership
- Judges sitting: Woodhouse P, McMullin J, Somers J

Keywords
- Non est factum, mistake, mutual mistake

Conlon v Ozolins (1984) NZLR 489 is an important New Zealand case involving the legal issues of non est factum and mutual mistake.

== Facts ==
Mrs. Ozolins, an elderly widow from Latvia in her seventies decided to sell three of the four sections that were behind her house in Albert Street in Palmerston North. She did not intend to sell the fourth section, as it was right behind her house and functioned as her back garden. This fourth section was separated from the three other sections by a six foot high fence. The other three sections formed a bare paddock.

Mr. Conlon, the local milkman, soon agreed to purchase these sections. Unfortunately, Mrs. Ozolin's solicitor in drafting up the sale agreement, misinterpreted her instructions and included the fourth section (effectively her back yard, as well as part of her garage) in the sale agreement.

The vendor did not notice this mistake when she signed it, signing the contract within an hour of receiving it. The mistake soon came to her attention, and she refused to transfer the fourth section to Mr. Conlon, whereupon he filed for specific performance in the High Court, and won, with the court ordering her to transfer ownership of the fourth section to Mr. Conlon. Mrs. Ozolins appealed to the New Zealand Court of Appeal.

== Judgment ==
Mrs. Ozolin's claims for non est factum and for mutual mistake were unsuccessful, as she was negligent in signing a contract that although she could not read, she knew at the time it was a contract to sell her land. However she did win under section 6 (1) (a) (iii) of the Contractual Mistakes Act (1977), and the matter was referred back to the High Court for a remedy to the situation.
