= Mr. Garlund =

1960 American television drama series

- Also known as: The Garlund Touch
- Theme music composer: Nathan Lang Van Cleave
- No. of seasons: 1
- No. of episodes: 6 episodes

Production
- Production locations: CBS Studios, New York City, NY
- Running time: 30 minutes

Original release
- Release: October 7 – December 23, 1960

Mr. Garlund, also known as The Garlund Touch, is an American television drama broadcast on CBS from October 7, 1960, to January 13, 1961, for just six episodes in 1960.

== Production ==
The show premiered on October 7, 1960. Episodes of the show were broadcast on CBS Fridays 9:30 to10 p.m. Eastern Time. The series was suspended for five weeks after its fifth episode, returning on December 23 with a new name, The Garlund Touch. two of the episodes were repeated, in early January 1961, then pulled from the airwaves.

== Summary ==
The show presented the adventures of Frank Garlund (played by veteran TV character actor Charles Quinlivan), a mysterious young financial wizard, whose only confidants were his Asian half-brother Kam Chang, and his foster-father Po Chang. Stories revolved around "Garlund's rise in the world of international business and intrigue", and the profound effect Garlund had on people's lives.

== Cast ==
- Charles Quinlivan as Frank Garlund
- Philip Ahn (whose later credits would include Master Kan in the TV series Kung Fu) as Po Chang
- Kam Tong (temporarily away from his recurring role as Kim Chan/Hey Boy on the concurrent TV series Have Gun, Will Travel) as Kam Chang

== Episode list ==
- Episode 1 (Pilot) Original Air Date: October 7, 1960

- Frank testifies against a racketeer. Harold Dryenforth and Joe Mantell guest-starred.

- Episode 2: The Towers Original Air Date: October 14, 1960

- Frank becomes the owner of two worthless towers due to a settlement in a will. Jay Novello and Patricia Huston guest-starred.

- Episode 3: ? Original Air Date: October 21, 1960

- Frank is accused of ordering the murder of a newspaper publisher.

- Episode 4: The X-27 Original Air Date: October 28, 1960

- The relationship between Frank and a test pilot's widow (Lisa Gaye) may have caused the release of an unstable aircraft.

- Episode 5: ? Original Air Date: November 4, 1960

- Not shown in New York City - instead, "Presidential Countdown" is listed in the New York Times at 9:30 for channel 2 between Route 66 and Twilight Zone

- Episode 6: To Double, Double Vamp Original Air Date: December 23, 1960

- William Campbell, Mark Tapscott, Robert Patten, David Alpert, Bing Russell, Jeanne Vaughn, Mike Ragan, Helen Wallace, and Joe Laden guest-starred.

== Reception ==
"This quirky light-hearted series from Paramount TV failed to catch on."
