= Mary A. Conlon =

American educator (1870–1936)

Mary A. Conlon (1870 – November 17, 1936) was an American educator. She served as the first principal of Walton High School, in New York City.

== Education ==
Conlon graduated from Hunter College and did graduate work at multiple schools including Columbia University, New York University, and Fordham University.

== Career ==
In the early 1900s, Conlon worked with Julia Lathers to establish the Bronx Day Nursery, first called the Abby Day Nursery, which was located at Abby House on East 142nd Street in New York City. She had noticed that some of her students had to miss school to take care of their younger siblings when unexpected events arose; Conlon realized that a nursery would allow her students to attend school more regularly if their parents had to work.

In 1922, Conlon was part of a group of educators that examined the patriotism of history texts in schools books being used in New York City classrooms. She also investigated schools in Gary, Indiana, Detroit, and Chicago.

Conlon was principal of the elementary school Public School 30 (P.S. 30) in the South Bronx. She started a junior high school for girls, and an evening school that was called the Evening Industrial High School, and 1914 was principal of the Evening High School in the Bronx. In 1923, she was named principal of the Walton Senior-Junior High School, which was divided into separate schools for junior high and senior high school in 1930. The Walton school is named after Mary Walton, the wife of Lewis Morris, a U.S. Constitution signatory. The school was first established in P.S. 30 next to the churchyard where Mary Walton and her husband are buried. The first graduation took place in January 1926 with 126 girls. From 1930, Conlon spent two years supervising the construction of a new building on Jerome Avenue and West 195th Street to house the school. In 1932, Conlon started as principal of the newly-opened Walton High for Girls school. While serving as principal, she testified before a 1930 United States Congress investigation into communist activities, and Conlon shared details about students at Walton Junior-Senior High School taking unexcused absences to celebrate May Day, also known as International Workers' Day. She also brought Greek into the classroom at Walton High School, the first time it was offered at public high schools in the Bronx. She served as principal of Walton High School until her death in 1936.

Conlon died on November 17, 1936, and the New York Times obituary described her work on schools in New York, the founding of the Abby Day Nursery, and her involvement in the High School Principals Association.
