= Leo Kinlen =

British cancer researcher

Leo Kinlen is a British cancer researcher. His hypothesis, explaining the higher rate of leukemia in the areas around the British Sellafield nuclear complex, than in other parts of the country, is that the mixing of the population, which occurred when people started moving into the area to work at the facility, resulted in the spreading of a virus that could cause leukemia. The theory was first developed in 1988 by Kinlen, and has achieved very little international recognition. No specific virus has been implicated.
