= Seven Guns to Mesa =

1958 film

- Directed by: Edward Dein
- Screenplay by: Myles Wilder; Edward Dein; Mildred Dein
- Produced by: William F. Broidy
- Starring: Charles Quinlivan; Lola Albright; James Griffith
- Cinematography: John J. Martin
- Edited by: Thor L. Brooks
- Music by: Leith Stevens
- Production company: Seven Arts Productions
- Distributed by: Allied Artists Picture Corporation
- Release date: March 16, 1958 (United States)
- Running time: 69 minutes
- Country: United States
- Language: English

Seven Guns to Mesa is a 1958 Western film directed by Edward Dein.

== Cast ==
- Charles Quinlivan as John Trey
- Lola Albright as Julie Westcott
- James Griffith as Papa Clellan
- Jay Adler as Ben Avery
- Jack Carr as Sam Denton
- John Cliff as Simmons
- Burt Nelson as Bear
- John Merrick as Brown
- Charles Keane as Marsh
- Rush Williams as Duncan
- Gerald Frank as Crandall
- Don Sullivan as Louis Middleton
- Reed Howes as Stage Driver
- Mauritz Hugo as Lt. Franklin
