= Queens Technical High School =

Public school in New York City

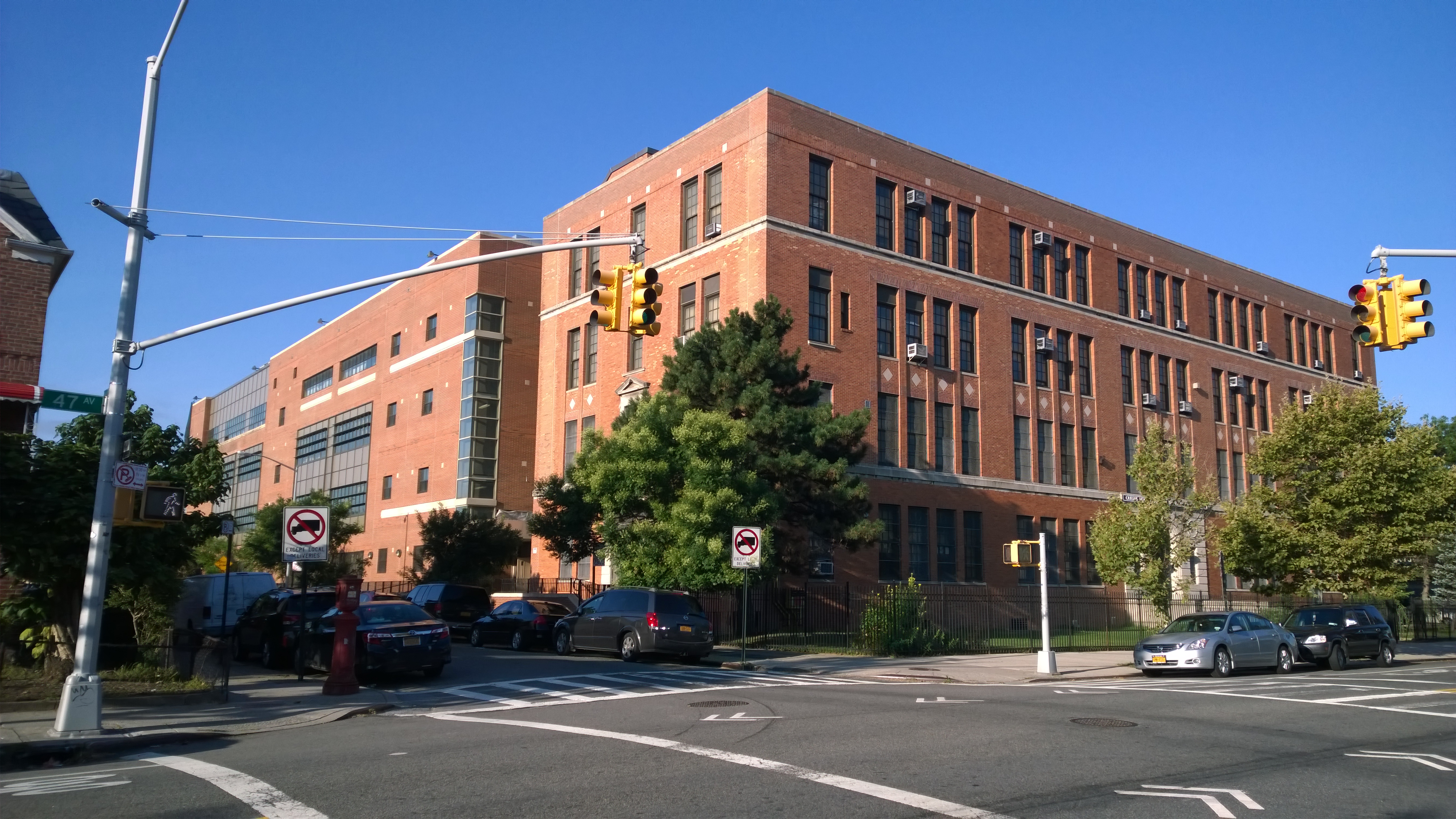
- Exterior of Queens Technical High School

Location
- 37-02 47th Ave; Long Island City, New York 11101; United States; 40.742120°N 73.927925°W

Information
- Type: Public
- Established: 1920; 106 years ago
- School district: New York City Department of Education
- School number: Q600
- NCES School ID: 360009802860
- Principal: Louis Garcia
- Teaching staff: 105.72 (on an FTE basis)
- Grades: 9-12
- Enrollment: 1,347 (2022-2023)
- Student to teacher ratio: 12.74
- Campus: City: Large
- Colors: Green and White
- Mascot: Tigers
- Nickname: Queens Tech
- Newspaper: The Technical Truth
- Website: www.queenstechhs.org

Queens Technical High School is a public career and technical education secondary school located in the Long Island City neighborhood of Queens in New York City, New York, US. The school has an enrollment of 1,400 students and serves grades 9-12. A new wing, completed in 2005, added a cafeteria, library, gymnasium, and additional classrooms. The following career and technical programs are available to students: Electrical Design and Installation, Plumbing Design and Technology, Pre-Engineering Electronic Technology, Computer Technology and Information Systems, Cisco networking, Cosmetology Careers/Salon Management, Barbering, and Graphic Design. The school is operated by the New York City Department of Education.

== Location ==
The school is situated between residential and industrial areas in Long Island City, Queens. The main entrance for all students, staff, and visitors is located on the corner of 38th Street and 47th Avenue. LaGuardia Community College is six blocks to the west, Aviation High School is one block to the west, and Queens Boulevard is one block to the north.

== Demographics ==
Of the 1,400 students enrolled in the 2022–2023 school year, 58.43% of students were male, while 41.57% were female. 82.07% of the students were Hispanic or Latino, 9.86% were Asian or Native Hawaiian/Other Pacific Islander, 4.43% were White, 2.29% were Black or African American, and 0.21% were multi-racial.

== Athletics ==
Queens Technical High School competes in the Public Schools Athletic League "B" division, with the exception of the varsity wrestling team that competes in the "A" division. Offerings include boys baseball, boys basketball, girls basketball, boys bowling, girls bowling, boys handball, boys soccer, girls soccer, girls softball, girls flag football, girls volleyball, and boys wrestling in "A". In 2009, the Queens Vocational boys soccer team captured the league championship by defeating Thomas Edison High School 3–2 on Randall's Island.
