= Tim Conlon =

Tim Conlon may refer to:

- Tim Conlon (actor), Canadian actor
- Tim Conlon (artist) (born 1974), American artist and graffiti writer
