= New Zealand Law Reports =

New Zealand Law Reports (NZLR)
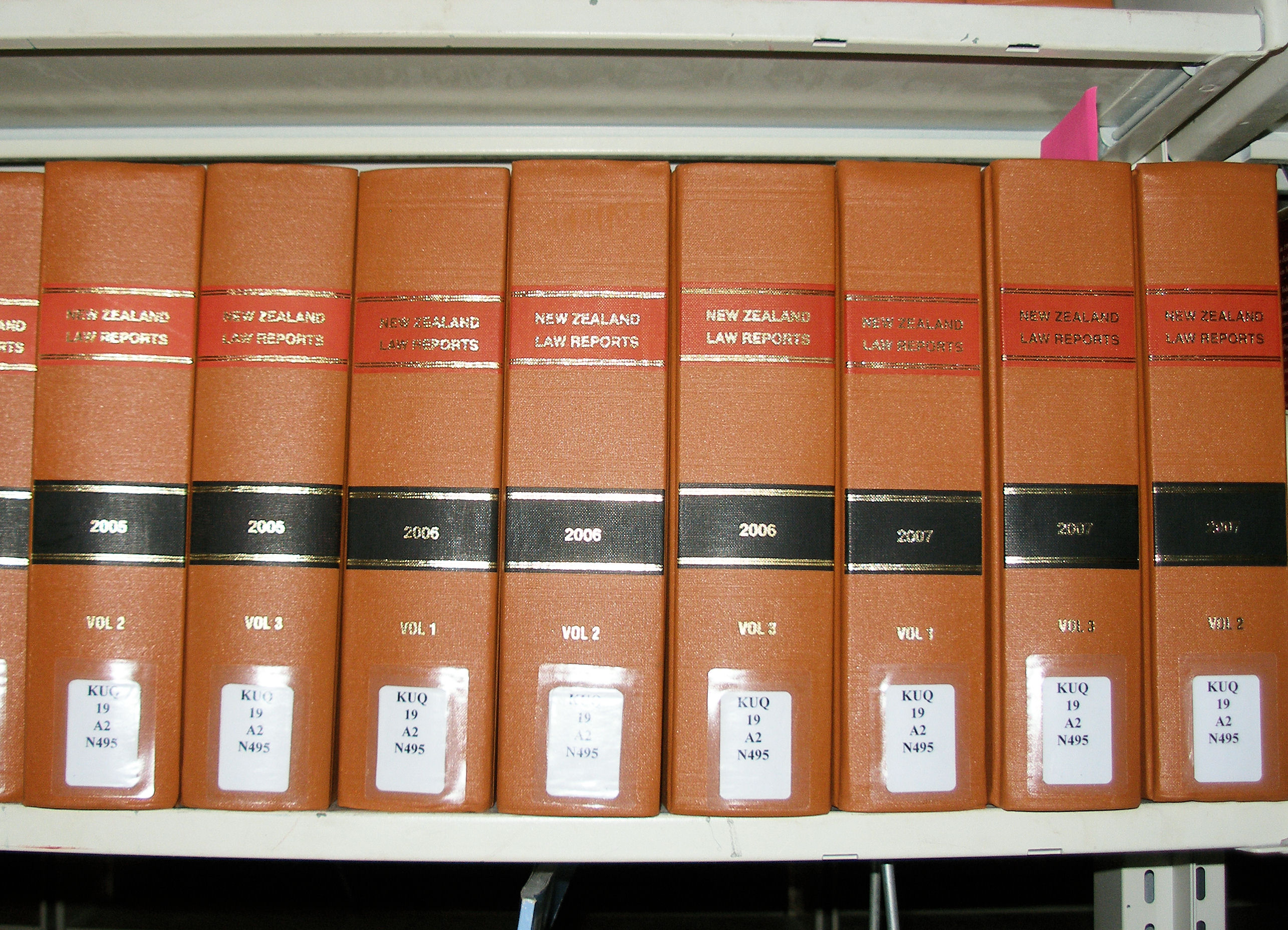
- Selected NZLR volumes at a law library.
- Author: Geoff Mclay (ed.)
- Language: English
- Subject: Law Report
- Publisher: LexisNexis New Zealand Ltd., a division of LexisNexis
- Publication date: 1861
- Publication place: New Zealand
- Media type: Print / Online
- LC Class: KG341.N4

The New Zealand Law Reports (NZLR) are the official law report series of the senior courts of New Zealand comprising the Supreme Court of New Zealand, Court of Appeal of New Zealand and High Court of New Zealand.

== Content ==
All Supreme Court decisions are reported with the argument of counsel. The reports do not focus on any specialist area of New Zealand law, unlike other specialist reports such as the New Zealand Administrative Reports (NZAR) and the New Zealand Family Law Reports (NZFLR).

== Publication ==
The New Zealand Council of Law Reporting (NZCLR) is an incorporated body charged with overseeing the publication of the NZLR. The NZLR is currently published for the Council by LexisNexis New Zealand Ltd.

The reports started in 1881 but complete sets have been deemed to start at 1861 and include a number of prior series. The reports are published both in print and online, being released in 18 parts over the year. These parts then make up 3 bound volumes of over 860 pages annually.

Charles Hutchinson QC (1906–1997) was the editor from 1971 to 1979.
