= Charles Quinlivan =

American actor (1924–1974)

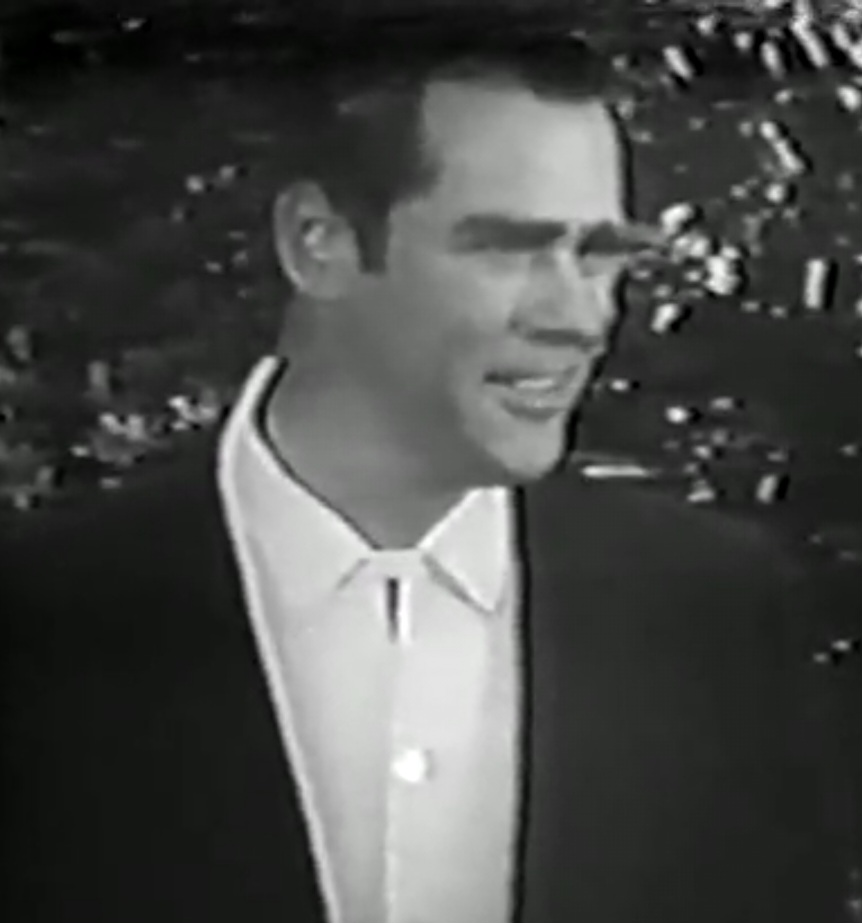
- Quinlivan in an episode of Lock-Up (1961)
- Born: September 30, 1924; Jersey City, New Jersey, U.S.
- Died: November 12, 1974 (aged 50); Fountain Valley, California, U.S.
- Resting place: Pacific View Memorial Park, Corona del Mar, California
- Occupation: Actor
- Years active: 1957–1974
- Spouse: Evelyn Byrd Jervey
- Children: 2

Charles Quinlivan (September 30, 1924 – November 12, 1974) was a film and television actor in the United States in the 1950s, 1960s, and 1970s, best known as the star of the western movie Seven Guns to Mesa, and played the title character of the short-lived (six episodes) 1960 TV series Mr. Garlund.

== Personal life ==
Charles Quinlivan was born September 30, 1924, in Jersey City, New Jersey. He married Evelyn Byrd Jervey, and had a daughter, Byrd, who became a physician, and a son, Charles, who became a best boy grip in the film industry.

Quinlivan was shot and wounded in an attempted murder-suicide in 1958. The perpetrator, Hendry Sargent, had targeted Quinlivan after he had seen the actor walking with Sargent's ex-wife.

He was buried in Hollywood Hills at Pacific View Memorial Park.

== Filmography ==
=== Film career ===
- Zero Hour! (1957) - Harry Burdick
- Seven Guns to Mesa (1958) - John Trey
- All the Young Men (1960) - Lt. Earl D. Toland
- Banning (1967) - Hob Davish (uncredited)
- Airport 1975 (1974) - Dan Vesper - Passenger (uncredited)

=== Television career ===
- Schlitz Playhouse of Stars (1957), in One Way Out - Kirkwood
- Goodyear Theatre (1958), in The White Flag - Larsen
- Cheyenne (1958), in Noose at Noon - Jim O'Neil
- Highway Patrol (1959), in Confession
- Sea Hunt (1960), in Hot Cargo - Colonel Korvin
- Mr. Garlund (1960), (6 episodes) - Frank Garlund
- The Barbara Stanwyck Show (1961), in The Cornerstone - Detective Thomas Kelly
- Lock-Up (1961), in The Intruder - Don Nichols
- Hawaii Five-O (1973), in Engaged to Be Buried - Carson
- Emergency! (1974), in Details - Driver (final appearance)
