= Greg Conlan =

Australian rules footballer

Personal information
- Born: 16 January 1963 (age 63)
- Original team: Nandaly
- Height: 185 cm (6 ft 1 in)
- Weight: 82 kg (181 lb)

Playing career^{1}
Years	Club	Games (Goals)
1983–1984	Richmond	6 (3)
- ^{1} Playing statistics correct to the end of 1984.

Greg Conlan (born 16 January 1963) is a former Australian rules footballer who played with Richmond in the Victorian Football League (VFL).

Conlan, who came to Richmond from Nandaly, made six appearances at VFL level. He played in the final four rounds of the 1983 VFL season, then in rounds 15 and 16 the following year.
