= Richard Conlon =

English playwright

- Born: 1965 (age 60–61); Hemel Hempstead
- Occupation: Playwright

Richard Conlon (born 1965 in Hemel Hempstead) is an English playwright.

His plays for young people are published by Heinemann, an arm of Pearson Education. As well as his own original works he has adapted Benjamin Zephaniah's novel ‘'Face'’ and ‘'Whispers in the Graveyard'’ by Theresa Brelsin for the stage. Both are published as play-texts for schools internationally. In 2010 he wrote Wasted for Forest Forge Theatre Company. For the same company he also wrote 'The Boy at the Edge of the Room' (for national touring) and 'Very Small And Very Far Away' (for young casts) both inspired by Lucy Lane Clifford's 'Wooden Tony'.

His work has been performed by youth theatres in venues including the Lawrence Batley Theatre, Birmingham Rep, The Watermill (Newbury), The Georgian Theatre Royal (Richmond) and The Castle Theatre (Wellingborough). His plays have also been performed in many English-speaking countries..

During his career, Conlon has been the recipient of two Arts Council England Awards, one of which was for the creation of 'Hope Springs' which has been performed in theatres across the UK, including at the Edinburgh Festival Fringe. A play inspired by an article by Guardian journalist Decca Aitkenhead. Conlon has received commissions from Farnham Maltings, Forest Forge Theatre Company, Bristol City Council, Take Art, The Old Vic and Somerset County Council.

In 2009 he began collaborating with Hampshire's Forest Forge Theatre Company on Lucy Clifford's short story 'Wooden Tony'. This turned into a play called 'The Boy at the Edge of the Room' which premiered in March 2013. The same short story has also been turned into a large-cast community piece called 'Very Small and Very far Away'.

Conlon is a member of the Writers' Guild of Great Britain, NAWE (National Association of Writers in Education) and NAYT (National Association of Youth Theatres). He lives just outside the Dorset town of Shaftesbury. In 2016 he took on the role of co-Artistic Director of Winchester's Blue Apple Theatre Company.

== Published works ==
- Hope Springs (2006) Heinemann ISBN 0-435-99996-6
- Face (2008) Heinemann ISBN 978-0-435-23344-0
- Whispers in the graveyard (2009) Heinemann ISBN 978-0-435-23347-1
- Paving Paradise (2010) Heinemann ISBN 978-0-435-04594-4
- The Death of Jude Hill (2011) Heinemann ISBN 978-0-435-04609-5 (part of Pearson Education's 'Heroes' series)
- The Emigrant's Friend (2013) Phoenix, Australia ISBN 978-1-921586-72-9
- Hope Springs - Youth Edition (2024) Samuel French ISBN 978-0-573-00044-7
- Hope Springs' (2024) Samuel French ISBN 978-0-573-00043-0
