= William Connellan =

Irish harper and composer

William Connellan (c.1630; date of death unknown) was an Irish harper and composer for the harp.

== Life ==
William Connellan was born in Cloonamahon, County Sligo, the younger brother of Thomas Connellan (c.1625–1698). Like Thomas, he became a harper and composer. William is famous for the words and music of "Molly McAlpine", sometimes also known as "Carolan's Dream". Turlough Carolan, Ireland's pre-eminent harper-composer of the late 17th and early 18th century, loved the song so much that he is stated as having said that he "would rather have been the composer of 'Molly McAlpine' than of any melody he himself had ever composed". He may also have composed the tune "Caoineach Luimnigh" (The Lament for Limerick). After Thomas's death, he travelled extensively in Scotland, where he was well known. There his version of "Luimnigh" became Lochabar No More. He is also credited with Love's A Tormenting Pain and probably Killiecrankie.

Arthur O'Neill (1734-1818) refers to William in his memoirs:

- I heard much of his brother William Connellan, who was a famous harper and a fine composer. He died in the county of Waterford.
