= Paul Conlon (rugby league) =

Australian rugby league footballer

Personal information
- Full name: Paul Conlon
- Born: 4 August 1966 (age 60)

Playing information
- Position: Fullback
Club
Years	Team	Pld	T	G	FG	P
1985–93	North Sydney Bears	98	18	89	1	251

Paul Conlon is an Australian former professional rugby league footballer who played for the North Sydney Bears as a fullback.

== Playing career ==
Conlon made his first grade debut for North Sydney Bears in Round 4 of the 1985 season against the Parramatta Eels in an 8–6 loss. Conlon went on to be the top point scorer for the club that season. In 1986, Conlon played in his first finals series as North Sydney played against Balmain in the elimination final which the bears lost 14–7. Over the following 3 seasons, Conlon suffered with injuries which limited the player to only 15 appearances.

In 1991, Conlon enjoyed his best season personally playing 23 games but handed over the goal kicking duties to Daryl Halligan. Norths had one of their best seasons in many years as a club as they finished 3rd on the table and qualified for the finals. In the first week of the finals, North Sydney defeated arch rivals Manly 28-16 setting up a grand final qualifier with Penrith. In the game against Penrith, Norths had the opportunity to reach their first final since 1943 but lost the match 16–14 with normally reliable goal kicker Halligan missing 4 out of 5 goal attempts. The following week, Norths lost the second preliminary final 30–14 with Conlon scoring a consolation try.

In 1992, North Sydney signed premiership winning Penrith player Greg Barwick who took Conlon's place as starting fullback. Conlon spent most of the season playing from the bench. In 1993 with the emergence of Matt Seers, Conlon was pushed further down the pecking order and only made two appearances that year before retiring.
