= Thomas Connellan =

Irish harpist and composer (c. 1625–1698)

Thomas Connellan (c. 1625 – 1698) was an Irish harp player and composer.

== Life ==
Connellan was born about 1625 at Cloonmahon, County Sligo. Both he and his brother William Connellan became harpers.

Thomas is reputed to have composed between 700 and 800 tunes, although most of these have not survived. His best-known tunes today are "Molly St. George", "The Dawning of the Day" ("Fáinne Geal an Lae"), also known as "The Golden Star", "Love in Secret", and "Planxty Davis". "The Dawning of the Day" has similarities with (but is not the same as) the melody used by Irish poet Patrick Kavanagh for his poem On Raglan Road.

According to Arthur O'Neill (1734-1818):

- "Thomas Conlan (Connellan) the great harper was born before my time. I heard he played very well. He made himself conspicuous in Scotland by means of the tune Lochaber, which he plastered on the Scots as one of his own compositions whereas it is well known it was composed by Miles O'Reilly of Killinkere, in the county Cavan under the name of 'Limerick's Lamentation.' However Conlan arrived to city honours in Edinburgh, chiefly by means of that tune among others. I heard they made him a bailie or burgomaster in Edinburgh where he died." (p. 13)
