= Thomas Connellan (priest) =

Rev. Thomas Connellan (1855 – 11 January 1917) was an Irish writer and Catholic priest, who left the church to become a clergyman of the Church of Ireland.

== Life ==
He was born in the parish of Geevagh, County Sligo. During his teenage years he went through was he called a "troubled time". He was educated in Athlone Diocesan School and Maynooth College and was ordained a Roman Catholic priest for the diocese of Elphin on 20 June 1880.

On 20 September 1887 he disappeared, leaving his clothes in a boat on Lough Ree. He was supposed to have been drowned, which attracted great attention at the time, and had the unlooked-for result of procuring some remarkable obituary notices in the Roscommon Messenger and other papers. The Town Board, Borough Court, and Board of Guardians all adjourned, as a mark of respect to his memory, while the Vicar-General of the diocese wrote a most sympathetic letter to his father. In fact he had fled to London, after which he became a member of the Church of Ireland.

He edited a paper called The Catholic, which had a considerable circulation, and wrote Hear the Other Side and a number of other books and pamphlets, which had a wide circulation. He set up a mission at 5IB Dawson Street, Dublin. With the assistance of his brother, Mr Joseph Connellan, he embarked upon the evangelisation of Ireland.

Connellan died from influenza on 11 January 1917, at Elm Grove, Blackrock, County Dublin.
