= Paul Conlon (footballer) =

English footballer

Personal information
- Full name: Paul Robert Conlon
- Date of birth: 5 January 1978 (age 48)
- Place of birth: Sunderland, England
- Position: Forward

Senior career*
Years	Team	Apps	(Gls)
1995–1996	Hartlepool United	15	(4)
1996–1997	Sunderland	0	(0)
1996	→ Gateshead (loan)	?	(?)
1997–1998	Doncaster Rovers	14	(1)
1998–2010	Gateshead	?	(?)
- * Club domestic league appearances and goals

Paul Robert Conlon (born 5 January 1978) is an English former footballer who played for Hartlepool United, Sunderland, Gateshead and Doncaster Rovers. He is currently serving 11 years and 10 months in prison for manslaughter.

== Club career ==
Conlon started his playing career for Hartlepool United. Conlon made his first appearance for Pools as a substitute in a 0–0 draw away to Torquay United in February 1996. Two weeks later, Conlon started his first game for the club and scored after just 93 seconds in a 4–1 win against Leyton Orient. His subsequent form led to Conlon being watched by numerous scouts.

In 1996, Conlon controversially signed for Sunderland for free due to a mix-up in his Hartlepool contract which led Pools boss Keith Houchen to accuse Sunderland of "doing the dirty" on them. Conlon was released a year later failing to make an appearance for the Black Cats.

Following his departure from Sunderland, Conlon played for Doncaster Rovers and Gateshead.

In 2004, Conlon was fined £250 and received a lifetime ban from the Durham FA after attacking a referee in a Sunday League game.

== Personal life ==
Conlon received an 18-month suspended sentence after pleading guilty to assaulting his wife in September 2013.

On 15 July 2021, Conlon was jailed for 11 years and 10 months for killing his father Harry Conlon on Christmas Eve, 2020.
