= National Register of Historic Places listings in Madison County, Indiana =

Location of Madison County in Indiana

This is a list of the National Register of Historic Places listings in Madison County, Indiana.

This is intended to be a complete list of the properties and districts on the National Register of Historic Places in Madison County, Indiana, United States. Latitude and longitude coordinates are provided for many National Register properties and districts; these locations may be seen together in a map.

There are 18 properties and districts listed on the National Register in the county. Another three properties were once listed but have been removed.

Properties and districts located in incorporated areas display the name of the municipality, while properties and districts in unincorporated areas display the name of their civil township. Properties and districts split between multiple jurisdictions display the names of all jurisdictions.

This National Park Service list is complete through NPS recent listings posted May 1, 2026.

== Current listings ==
	Name on the Register	Image	Date listed	Location	City or town	Description
1	Anderson Bank Building	Anderson Bank Building	August 30, 1984 (#84001078)	931 Meridan St. 40°06′23″N 85°40′47″W	Anderson	
2	Anderson Downtown Historic District	Anderson Downtown Historic District	April 19, 2006 (#06000307)	Roughly Meridian St. from 10th to the former Conrail rail line and the first block west of 11th and 12th Sts. 40°06′13″N 85°40′47″W	Anderson	
3	Carnegie Public Library	Carnegie Public Library	March 21, 1985 (#85000603)	32 W. 10th St. 40°06′23″N 85°40′49″W	Anderson	
4	Anderson High School Wigwam	Anderson High School Wigwam	September 4, 2018 (#100002863)	1229 Lincoln St. 40°06′09″N 85°41′09″W	Anderson	
4	Central Avenue School	Central Avenue School	June 21, 2007 (#07000562)	2120 Central Ave. 40°05′41″N 85°40′34″W	Anderson	
5	Chesterfield Spiritualist Camp District	Chesterfield Spiritualist Camp District	July 17, 2002 (#02000192)	200-300 blocks of Eastern, Parkview, and Western Drs. 40°07′00″N 85°35′50″W	Chesterfield	
6	Elwood Downtown Historic District	Elwood Downtown Historic District	October 15, 2002 (#02001175)	Roughly bounded by Duck Creek, N. A St., 16th St., and S. C St. 40°16′35″N 85°50′30″W	Elwood	
7	Fall Creek Meeting House	Fall Creek Meeting House	January 2, 1997 (#96001544)	State Road 38 southeast of Pendleton, approximately 1.5 miles southeast of its junction with U.S. Route 36; 39°59′35″N 85°42′23″W	Fall Creek Township	
8	Gruenewald House	Gruenewald House	October 8, 1976 (#76000028)	626 N. Main St. 40°06′34″N 85°40′40″W	Anderson	
9	Madison County Bridge No. 149	Madison County Bridge No. 149	December 22, 2008 (#08001212)	Fall Creek Parkway and Huntsville Pike over Fall Creek; 40°00′29″N 85°44′07″W	Pendleton	
10	George Makepeace House	George Makepeace House	March 21, 1985 (#85000596)	5 W. Main St. 40°06′48″N 85°35′45″W	Chesterfield	
11	Mounds State Park	Mounds State Park	January 18, 1973 (#73000022)	3 miles east of downtown Anderson on State Road 32; 40°06′01″N 85°37′19″W	Anderson and Union Township	
12	Paramount Theater Building	Paramount Theater Building	August 29, 1991 (#91001165)	1124 Meridian St. 40°06′16″N 85°40′44″W	Anderson	
13	Pendleton Historic District	Pendleton Historic District	May 15, 1991 (#91000788)	Roughly bounded by Fall Creek, the Conrail right of way, and Madison and Adams Sts. 40°00′10″N 85°44′48″W	Pendleton	
14	Joseph & Lucinda Thawley House	Joseph & Lucinda Thawley House	September 24, 2009 (#09000760)	300 E. North Main St. 40°20′25″N 85°38′37″W	Summitville	
15	Tower Hotel	Tower Hotel	October 10, 1997 (#97001180)	1109 Jackson St. 40°06′18″N 85°40′51″W	Anderson	
16	West Central Historic District	West Central Historic District	December 6, 1984 (#84000515)	Roughly bounded by Brown-Delaware, 10th, John, and 13th Sts. 40°06′18″N 85°41′00″W	Anderson	
17	West Eighth Street Historic District	West Eighth Street Historic District	August 27, 1976 (#76000029)	Roughly bounded by 7th, 9th, Jackson, and Henry Sts. 40°06′29″N 85°41′20″W	Anderson	

== Former listings ==
	Name on the Register	Image	Date listed	Date removed	Location	City or town	Description
1	Elwood Passenger and Freight Depot		April 3, 1980 (#80000045)	March 5, 1984	16th and S. B Sts.	Elwood	Passenger Depot torn down in June, 1983. The Freight Depot was burned in a control fire on January 5, 1990.
2	Solomon Fussell Farm		June 4, 1992 (#92000675)	June 8, 2011	State Road 38 east of its junction with County Road 150W; 39°59′20″N 85°41′54″W	Pendleton	
3	Wendell L. Willkie School		May 12, 1975 (#75000029)	January 19, 1990	1630 Main St. 40°16′38″N 85°50′21″W	Elwood	Newer building burned June 22, 1988; older building razed same year.

== See also ==
- List of National Historic Landmarks in Indiana
- National Register of Historic Places listings in Indiana
- Listings in neighboring counties: Delaware, Grant, Hamilton, Hancock, Henry, Tipton
- List of Indiana state historical markers in Madison County
