= Walston =

Walston may refer to:

== People ==
- Walston (surname), notable people with this surname
- Patrick Anderson of Walston, 17th-century British minister and Covenanter

== Places ==
- Walston, South Lanarkshire, a hamlet in Scotland
- Walston, Pennsylvania, a community in the United States

== Other ==
- DuPont Walston, defunct American financial services company
- J. Roddy Walston and the Business, American rock band
- Walston's tube-nosed bat (Murina walstoni), southeast-Asian species of vesper bat
