= Walston (surname) =

Walston is a surname. Notable people with this surname include:

- Blake Walston (born 2001), American baseball player
- Bobby Walston (1928–1987), American football player, coach, and administrator
- Charles Walston (or Waldstein, 1856–1927), American and British archaeologist, cosmopolite, and Olympics competitor; father of Henry
- Henry Walston (1912–1991), British baron, farmer, agricultural researcher, and politician; son of Charles
- J. Roddy Walston (born ?), American musician and member of the band J. Roddy Walston and the Business
- James Walston (1950–2014), British political scientist and historian; son of Henry
- Len Walston (born 1981), American singer-songwriter, composer, musician, producer, and audio engineer
- Ray Walston (1914–2001), American actor

== See also ==
- Patrick Anderson of Walston, 17th-century British minister and Covenanter
- Saint Walston (or Walstan, c.975?–c.1016), sainted English prince
