= Central Avenue School =

Central Avenue School may refer to:

- Central Avenue School (Lakeland, Florida), listed on the National Register of Historic Places (NRHP)
- Central Avenue School (Anderson, Indiana), listed on the NRHP in Indiana
