= Anderson station (New York Central Railroad) =

Railway station in the United States

Anderson

General information
- Location: 29 Dillon Street; Anderson, Indiana
- Coordinates: 40.1012°N 85.6786°W

History
- Opened: June 19, 1851
- Closed: April 30, 1971

Services
Preceding station	New York Central Railroad	Following station
Indianapolis toward St. Louis	Big Four Route Main Line	Muncie toward Cleveland
Pendleton toward St. Louis	Big Four Route Main Line	Chesterfield toward Cleveland
- Big Four Railroad Station
- U.S. Historic district – Contributing property
- Part of: Anderson Downtown Historic District (Anderson, Indiana) (ID06000307)
- Designated CP: April 19, 2006
Location

Anderson station is a former railway station in Anderson, Indiana.

The Indianapolis and Bellafontaine Railroad reached Anderson on June 19, 1851. and would construct the extant station building in 1887. Rail service ceased after April 30, 1971, when Amtrak assumed most American inter-city rail operations.

After abandonment, the building was purchased by Elsie Perdieu in 1983 to serve as a museum for displaying her late husband's, Paul Perdieu's, railroad memorabilia which he had acquired over twenty years. The Anderson Young Ballet Theater began utilizing the east wing starting in 1985. The station was renovated between 2002 and October 2003.

The building was listed on the Indiana Register of Historic Sites and Structures in 1996. It was deemed a contributing property to the Anderson Downtown Historic District when it was added to the National Register of Historic Places in 2006.
