= West Central Historic District =

West Central Historic District may refer to:

- West Central Historic District (Biloxi, Mississippi), listed on the NRHP in Mississippi
- West Central Historic District (Anderson, Indiana), listed on the NRHP in Indiana
