= Tower Hotel =

Tower Hotel may refer to:

- Thistle Tower Hotel - A hotel beside Tower Bridge, on the River Thames in London
- Tower Hotel (Anderson, Indiana) - An apartment building, on the US Register of Historic Places
- Tower Hotel (Niagara Falls), formerly the Konica Minolta Tower Centre, a tower hotel in Niagara Falls, Ontario, Canada
