= List of Indiana state historical markers in Madison County =

Location of Madison County in Indiana

This is a list of the Indiana state historical markers in Madison County.

This is intended to be a complete list of the official state historical markers placed in Madison County, Indiana, United States by the Indiana Historical Bureau. The locations of the historical markers and their latitude and longitude coordinates are included below when available, along with their names, years of placement, and topics as recorded by the Historical Bureau. There are 7 historical markers located in Madison County.

== Historical markers ==
Marker title	Image	Year placed	Location	Topics
Massacre of Indians		1966	State Road 38 0.5 miles east of Markleville; 39°58′31.2″N 85°36′12″W	American Indian/Native American
Indiana's First Interurban		1967	Southeastern corner of the junction of Harrison and Church Streets in Alexandria; 40°15′48.6″N 85°40′27.6″W	Transportation, Business, Industry, and Labor
Wendell Willkie		2001	Junction of 19th and N. J Streets at Callaway Park near a picnic pavilion along Big Duck Creek in Elwood; 40°17′6″N 85°50′5″W	Politics
Abolitionists Mobbed		2013	Falls Park, Pendleton; 40°00′22.9″N 85°44′42.2″W	
Indians Murdered 1824		2016	Just north of the N. Pendleton Ave. bridge over Fall Creek, Pendleton; 40°00′23.2″N 85°44′41.9″W	Native American, Law & Court Case
Walter Dorwin Teague		2019	424 E. State St., Pendleton; 40°00′05.2″N 85°44′25.2″W	Business, Labor & Industry
William (Bill) Walker		2022	Near 221 Falls Park Dr., Pendleton; 40°00′21.8″N 85°44′35.5″W	African American, Arts & Culture

== See also ==
- List of Indiana state historical markers
- National Register of Historic Places listings in Madison County, Indiana
