= Donald Starr =

American journalist

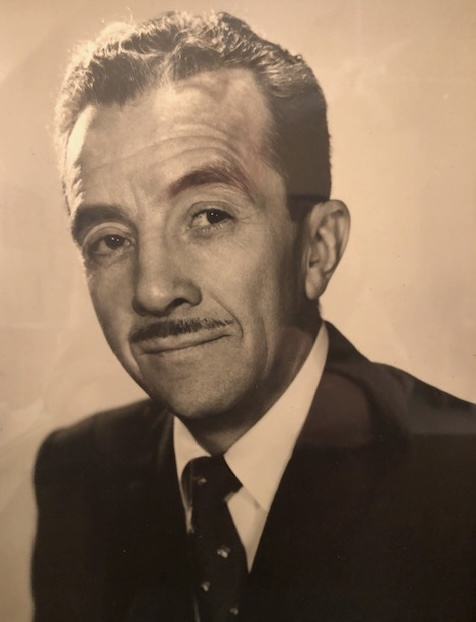
- Born: October 10, 1905; Anderson, Indiana
- Died: June 03, 1973 (aged 67); Arlington, Virginia, U.S.
- Employer: Chicago Tribune
- Known for: Publishing the Overseas edition of the Chicago Tribune in the Pacific Theater during World War II

Donald Alonzo Starr (October 10, 1905 - June 3, 1973) was an American journalist for the Chicago Tribune. He began printing and distributing overseas editions of the Tribune during the Second World War, first in Sydney, Australia, and later in Manila, Philippines, and finally in Tokyo, after the formal surrender of Japan. He was the only war correspondent with General MacArthur during the liberation of Borneo in June 1945. Starr was known for his scrounging abilities and overcoming obstacles in austere environments to publish the overseas edition of the Chicago Tribune.

== Early life and education ==
Donald Starr was a native of Anderson, Indiana. His parents were Alonzo Starr and Mary McFarland Starr. Starr attended public schools in Anderson and was a student at the University of Illinois for three and a half years.

== Career ==
Upon leaving the University of Illinois in 1927, Starr returned to Anderson and became the sports editor at the local newspaper, The Bulletin. Two years later, in 1929, Starr moved to Des Moines, and went to work for The Des Moines Register to write sports, and subsequently become swing man, makeup editor, slot man, and news editor. He worked there until joining the Chicago Tribune staff in March 1934.

=== World War II ===
At the Chicago Tribune, Starr worked as a copyreader, picture editor, chief of the New York Bureau, foreign correspondent, foreign news editor, and assistant managing editor. His first overseas assignment was to Australia in summer of 1944 to start an overseas edition of the Tribune there. J. Loy (Pat) Maloney, then managing editor of the Tribune, transferred Starr from his desk at the New York Bureau and told him to make a quick trip to Australia to start the Overseas Tribune. That trip turned into two years. He published the first edition of the Overseas Tribune in Sydney around Christmas of 1944.

==== Battle of Manila ====
In January 1945, Starr left the Overseas Tribune in local hands and went to the Philippines, arriving in Lingayen on Luzon Island. The movement to retake Manila had started. Starr entered Manila with the US Army's 37th Infantry Division, commanded by Major General Robert Beightler. Starr was with the point unit, the 148th Infantry Regiment, which reached Manila on Sunday morning, February 4. At the time, neither the U.S. Army First Cavalry Division nor the 37th Infantry Division knew that each unit had penetrated the outskirts of the city.

Starr went ahead of the unit through a neighborhood looking for the University of Santo Tomas. The University of Santo Tomas housed an internment camp operated by the Japanese occupying force. It held approximately 3,700 internees, including more than 60 US Army nurses captured in 1942. Starr was walking on Avenida Rizal, one of Manila's main thoroughfares, and asked a local citizen for directions to the university. The person guided him to within three blocks of the university entrance. Approaching the university entrance, Starr came to a stone wall and followed it past three dead Japanese soldiers. He was then pinned down by machinegun fire from a nearby sandbag pile. This was an outpost of the First Cavalry Division which had fought its way to the internment camp the night before and were now awaiting reinforcements. Starr was brought before Brigadier General William C. Chase, commander of 1st Brigade, who was leading the three flying columns formed by 1st Cavalry Division's commander, Major General Verne Mudge, for the rapid advance on Manila. Chase expressed surprise when he realized that Starr came through "no man’s land" alone and when Starr told him that his reinforcements from the 37th Infantry Division were only a half mile away. Chase formed a force of two heavy tanks and 200 rifleman to link up with the reinforcements, and Starr guided the force to them.

In March 1945 Starr began a search for the equipment and power to begin printing editions of the Overseas Tribune from Manila. While at Santo Tomas, Starr met up with two other Chicago Tribune reporters: Walter Simmons and Arthur Veysey. They celebrated their reunion at the nearby San Miguel Brewery. It was there that Starr found ten presses for printing bottle labels. He had recently received plastic plates for printing the Overseas Tribune. He also found paper of various colors. Electric power was out in the city and Starr was unable to obtain a generator. There was a working power line a half block from his press, but to print the paper he needed 200 feet of special wire to tap into it. Starr spent much time searching the city for this wire, traveling place to place due to a lack of telephone service. He was finally able to obtain some wire captured from the Japanese. With all the required equipment obtained in late March, Starr, with the help of some of the brewery print shop crew, began printing the Overseas Chicago Tribune, starting with an initial run of 2,000 16-page newspapers. By the end of March, the run had grown to 10,000 copies a week, twice that of Time or Newsweek, the two other publications in the field. (D. Starr, personal communication, March 26, 1945.)

Copies of this paper were distributed to Army soldiers in the Philippines and to sailors stationed offshore. The challenges Starr faced with trying to print the Overseas Chicago Tribune with only a very small crew is explained in a personal letter he wrote to one of his sisters on July 18, 1945:

I've had a hair raising six weeks chasing from one end of the islands to the other trying to find 41 tons of paper and getting them moved to Manila. I ushered them here only to have them go astray in Manila. During this period I was trying to find warehousing space in a city where all the buildings were destroyed and in which the army is using every available inch of space and building much it needs for equipment. Then I refound the paper in Manila, and am now engaged in trucking it to my new warehouse, which will undoubtably cause me to lose the whole shebang when the first typhoon hits. (D. Starr, personal communication, July 18, 1945.)

==== Borneo Campaign ====
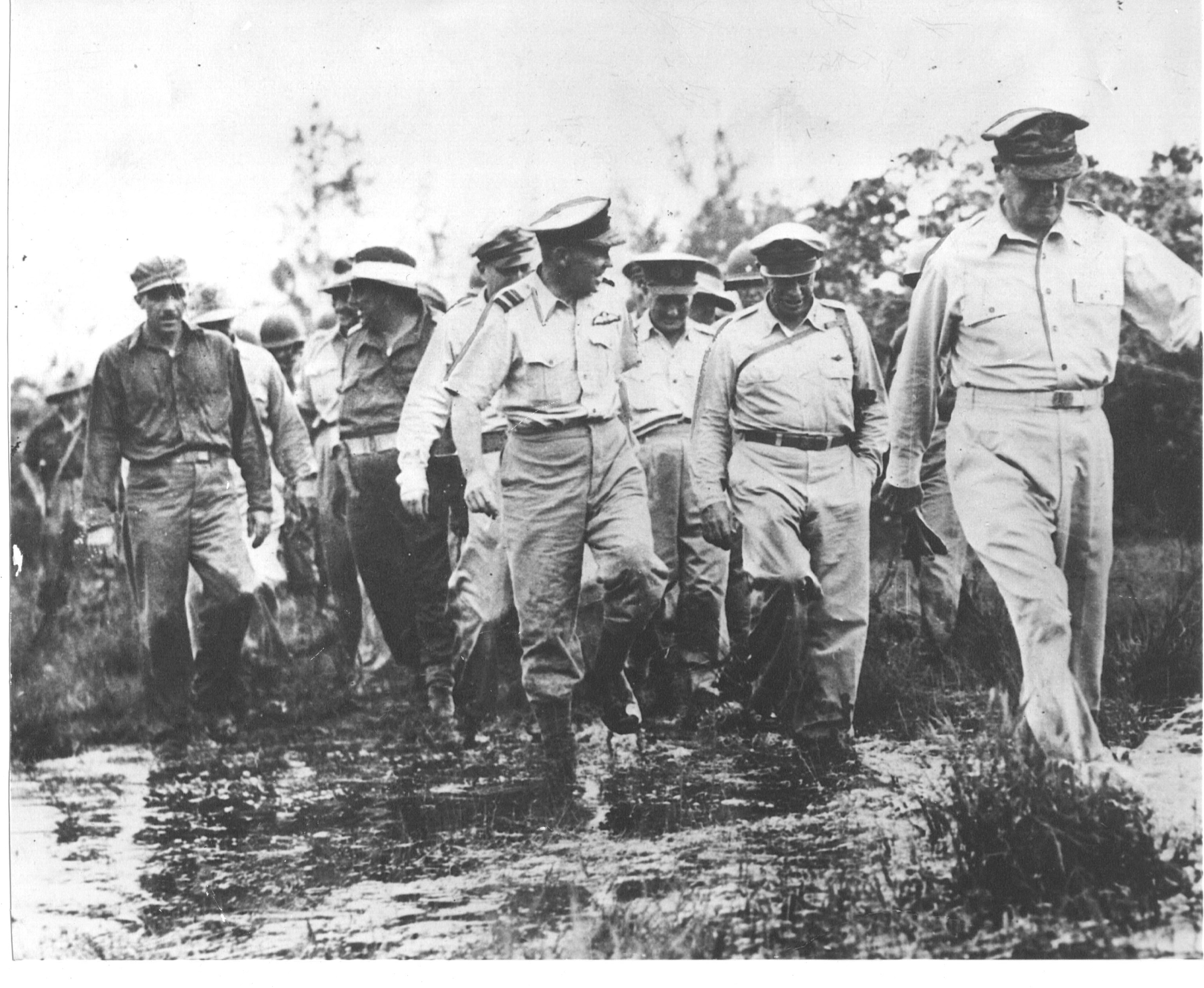
Photo taken June 10, 1945, on Labuan Island, Borneo, during the first day of the Australian operation there. Right-to-left: General Douglas MacArthur, Lieutenant General George Kenney, Brigadier General Bonner Fellers (in helmet, partially obscured by Kenney), Australian Commanding General Sir Leslie Morshead, Australian Air Marshal William Bostock (talking to Kenney), Colonel Courtney Whitney (partially obscured by Bostock), Australian 9th Division Commander, Major General George Wooten (hat with white band turning to speak with Don Starr), Donald Starr.

During the May–August 1945 allied campaign for Borneo, Starr was the only American war correspondent with General MacArthur when he first came ashore on Labuan Island on June 10 to inspect a beachhead following amphibious landings that morning. Starr's pooled accounts of the fighting were released to all newspapers.

==== Japan's surrender ====
On August 29, 1945, 14 days after the initial announcement of Japan's surrender, Starr flew from Manila to Okinawa, Japan. In an attempt to get to Tokyo ahead of other correspondents, Starr boarded a US Army Air Forces C-54 transport aircraft on August 31 (with a few other correspondents) and landed at Atsugi Airfield outside of Yokohama. Once there, Starr found an interpreter and took the train from Yokohama to Tokyo. He reached Tokyo at 11:00 am and made his way to the Nippon Times office, where an American-born Japanese reporter named "Sheba," who had been a Chicago Tribune correspondent there before the war, was working. He spent the afternoon obtaining as much information as possible from "Sheba," arranged to obtain a press and paper to print the Chicago Tribune Overseas edition, and headed back to Yokohama to file the stories he had gathered. (D. Starr, personal communication, September 5, 1945.)

("Sheba" whom Starr mentioned in his September 5, 1945, letter was likely Kimpei Shiba. Shiba had been the Tokyo correspondent for the Chicago Tribune from 1929 until the outbreak of World War II. After the war, he founded the Asahi Evening News, the English-language edition of The Asahi Shimbun. Shiba retired in 1986. He died on October 25, 1996, in his home in Tokyo at the age of 93.)

On September 2, Starr traveled on the naval destroyer USS Taylor to the battleship USS Missouri for the official surrender ceremony. Starr and two other Chicago Tribune correspondents, Arthur Veysey and Robert Cromie, drew straws for the three stories they thought they should write to cover the signing of the surrender documents. Starr was assigned to a position on the second deck above the deck on which the signing took place, but he spotted an Australian Army officer he knew who was an aide to General Blamey, and went to greet him. He was standing only a few feet from the signing table and allowed Starr to stand with him throughout the ceremony. (D. Starr, personal communication, September 5, 1945.)

=== Postwar career ===
In addition to writing news stories on postwar Japan, Starr printed and distributed the overseas edition of the Chicago Tribune from Tokyo. The first printing of the Overseas Tribune from Japan rolled off the presses on September 14, 1945. This issue of 3,000 copies was the first American paper printed in Japan since the war's end, making Starr "the first American newsboy in Japan." 2,400 copies were distributed to the special services officer for the US 8th Army, and they were in turn distributed to every American Army unit on the island of Honshu. The first copy of that edition was autographed by General Douglas MacArthur and the second was autographed by General Robert Eichelberger, the commander of the 8th Army. Both copies were sent to the Chicago Tribune office as souvenirs.

==== Chinese Civil War ====
Starr continued to report for and print the Overseas Tribune from Tokyo until March 1946, when he was recalled to Chicago. Within a month, he was sent to Shanghai to report on the Chinese Civil War. He traveled throughout China, attempting to cover the activities of the American truce teams, who were assigned to bring the Nationalist and communist forces together, and of the Military Advisory Group in China, created by the U.S. Army and U.S. Navy to continue the modernization of Nationalist forces. Starr watched and reported on the steady decline of the Nationalist forces as they abandoned area after area. By June 1948, it was clear that the communists were about to completely take over China and Starr was ordered home.

==== Cold War reporting ====
Upon his return to the US, Starr worked briefly in the Chicago Tribune's sports department and then on the local copy desk, and in August 1954 was named the foreign news editor, replacing Paul E. Jacoby, who had died on August 3, 1954. In June 1964, Starr took a 2,500 mile journey through the Balkan Iron Curtain countries of Bulgaria, Romania, and Yugoslavia, where he spoke with government officials and workers while visiting factories and farms. His reports and observations were published in nine daily installments beginning on June 27, 1964. Starr's closeup look at life in these countries attempted to answer several questions including why Balkan industrial planners were as behind the times as the agricultural planners, why stores were glutted with goods nobody wants, why factories kept making things that were out of date and unsellable, how capitalist incentives of private enterprises were being widely adopted, and why the master plans of these countries provided for the "institutionalizing" of the citizen from the cradle to the grave.

In 1965 Starr made a similar "meet the people" journey, this time through Czechoslovakia and East Germany. He was accompanied by his multi-lingual wife, Madita. This report was published in a series of installments in June 1965.

Starr was promoted to assistant managing editor in December 1967. He retired from the Chicago Tribune on October 31, 1970, after serving for 42 years as a journalist, 36 of them at the Chicago Tribune.

== Personal life and death ==
Donald Starr married Katherine E. Muns on June 11, 1926, in Bement, Illinois. Although Illinois records of county marriages state they married on May 30, 1927, a newspaper marriage announcement on May 15, 1927, reported that they actually married in June 1926 after returning from the University of Illinois senior ball, and kept the marriage a secret from close family and friends for almost a year. They had one daughter. They divorced on February 3, 1948. Donald married Maria Edith (Madita) Chae (née Kral) on February 14, 1948. Donald and Madita met in Shanghai while he was assigned there. Donald died on June 3, 1973, in Arlington, VA.
