= Solomon Fussell Farm =

- Formerly listed on the U.S. National Register of Historic Places
- Location within Indiana Location within the United States
- Location: Pendleton, Indiana
- Coordinates: 40°0′10″N 85°44′48″W
- Area: 2.5 acres (1.0 ha)
- Architectural style: pioneer construction
- NRHP reference No.: 92000675

Significant dates
- Added to NRHP: June 4, 1992
- Removed from NRHP: June 8, 2011

The Solomon Fussell Farm is located 3 miles (4.8 km) east of Pendleton, Indiana on State Road 38 at the junction of county road 150 West. The main feature is a 2 1/2-story log house built by Samuel Fussell in 1832. Extensive later additions have been attached to the rear. Also existent are out buildings including a barn.

The Fussell family were members of the local Quaker community. Several members of the Fussell family are buried in the cemetery of the nearby Fall Creek Meeting House.

It was listed on the National Register of Historic Places in 1992 and delisted in 2011.
