= Len Walston =

American singer-songwriter

Leonard Walston
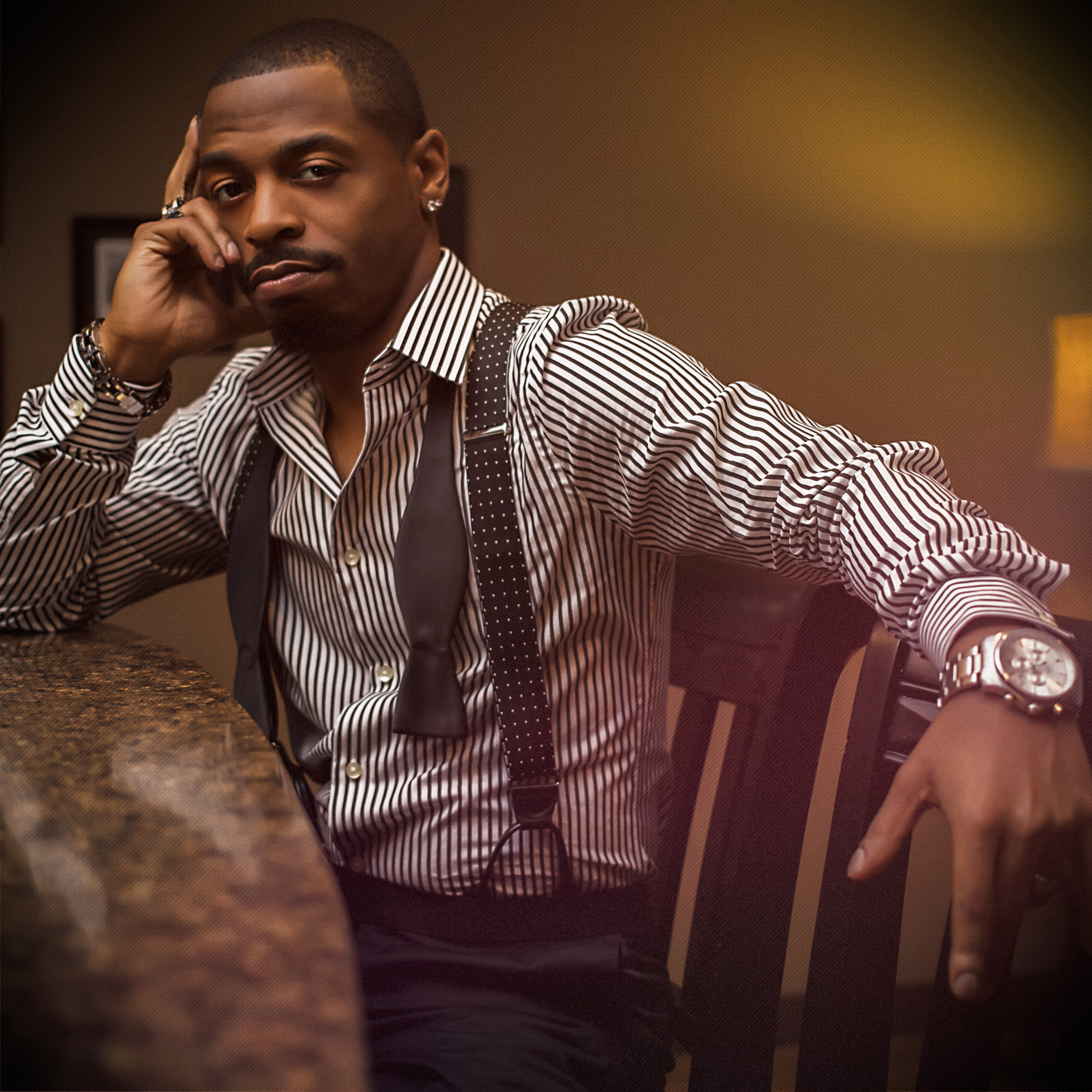

Background information
- Born: Leonard Christophere' Walston III; October 17, 1981 (age 45); Anderson, Indiana; United States
- Genres: R&B, soul, jazz, a cappella
- Occupations: Singer-songwriter, composer, musician, producer, audio engineer, mixing engineer
- Instruments: Vocals, piano, keys, electric/upright bass, percussion
- Years active: 2001–present
- Labels: Third Pocket Music Group, LLC.

Leonard Christophere' Walston III (born October 17, 1981), is an American-born singer-songwriter, composer, musician, producer, and audio engineer. In 2013, his independent release, "You Should Be Here" spent more than three months on the UK Soul Charts and was named 2013's #1 Song of the Year by the Soul Discovery Radio Show and Podcast on Solar Radio.

== Biography ==
Leonard Walston was born on October 17, 1981, in Anderson, Indiana, to Leonard Jr. and Harrita Walston. His appreciation for music began at an early age; playing the piano at age four and singing in church and school at age five. In the spring of 2000, Walston left Anderson to attend the Berklee College of Music in Boston, MA, where he majored in Music Business & Administration. After graduating in the spring of 2003, he moved to Minneapolis, Minnesota to further his education at the Institute of Production and Recording (IPR) and pursue a career as a music producer and audio engineer.

== Recordings ==
The breakthrough for Leonard Walston occurred with his independent recording, "You Should Be Here", which was written, produced, performed, mixed, and mastered by Walston himself. "You Should Be Here" was released August 13, 2013, on iTunes, CD Baby, Google Play, and Amazon. Within two days of its release, the single became a top seller on CD Baby's Urban/R&B charts.

‘You Should Be Here' was well received internationally, gaining its first notoriety in the UK. The single gained favorable reviews from online Soul and Jazz music reviewers. Sonic Soul Reviews said that Walston "lets his true destiny run free" and that 'You Should Be Here' is a "great song. . ." with "great production, great voice." During an interview with Walston and Soul Discovery's Mick O'Donnell of Solar Radio, O'Donnell refers to Walston and his song 'You Should Be Here' as "an amazing voice, amazing production and lyric content. You can't beat it." Roger Williams of SoulSorts on the HotFM called it "five and a half minutes of the finest soul music release this year".

== Discography ==
=== Singles ===
Year	Single	Credits	Recognition/Accolades
2013	"You Should Be Here"	Writer, producer, Mixing/Mastering, Engineer/Musician, Vocalist	Three Months on the UK Soul Chart; Peaked at #11; Named #1 Song on 2013 by Mick O'Donnell of the Soul Discovery Radio Show and Podcast, Solar Radio; Named #10 Song of 2013 by Roger Williams of the Soulsorts Radio Show and Podcast, HotFM Smooth Grooves Radio; Named #1 Song of 2013 by Rob Boogie of the Sugar Soul Podcast
