= Anderson Downtown Historic District (Anderson, Indiana) =

Historic district in Indiana, United States

- U.S. National Register of Historic Places
- U.S. Historic district
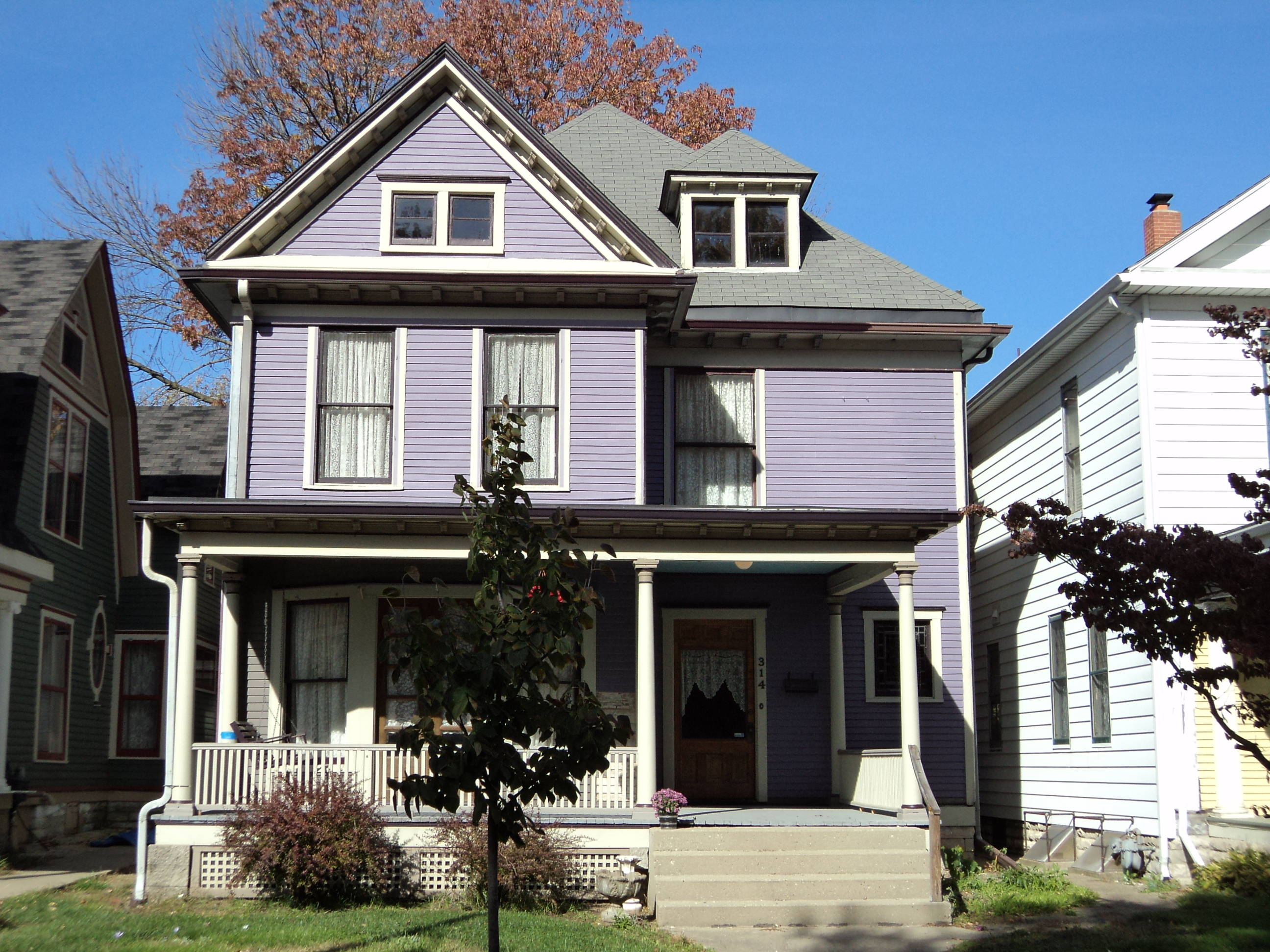

- Location within Indiana Location within the United States
- Location: Roughly Meridian St., from 10th to Conrail RR and first blk W of 11th and 12th Sts., Anderson, Indiana
- Coordinates: 40°6′13″N 85°40′47″W
- Area: 17 acres (6.9 ha)
- Architect: Miller, Erwin; Strauss, Alvin M., et al.
- Architectural style: Italianate, Classical Revival, et al.
- NRHP reference No.: 06000307
- Added to NRHP: April 19, 2006

Anderson Downtown Historic District is a national historic district located at Anderson, Indiana. The district dates from c. 1887 to 1955 and encompasses 32 contributing buildings in the central business district of Anderson. Despite some loss of integrity due to demolition and alteration, the district still includes a significant collection of historic and architecturally distinguished commercial buildings. Aside from the usual historic commercial impact of similar districts, this district includes several properties that illustrate Anderson's transportation heritage. Included in the district or nearby are the following individual sites on the National Register of Historic Places: Paramount Theatre, Tower Hotel, Anderson Bank Building, Gruenewald House, and The Anderson Center for the Arts. Additional notable or interesting buildings include the Union Building, the State Theater, the Central Christian Church, the Anderson YMCA, the old post office and the Big Four Railroad Depot.

It was listed in the National Register of Historic Places in 2006.
