= Walston, South Lanarkshire =

Coordinates: 55°42′N 3°30′W

Walston
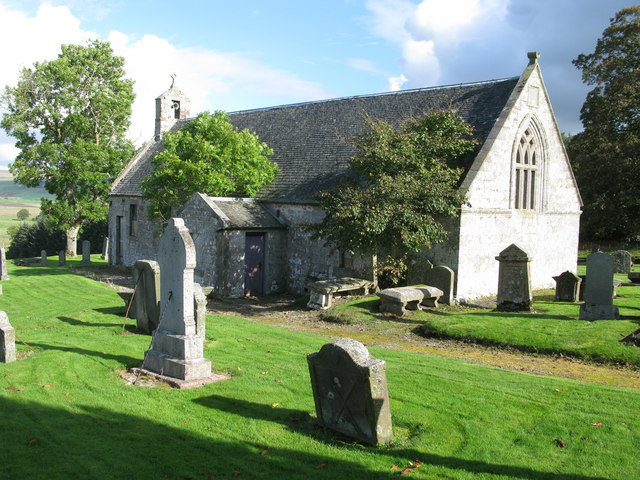
- Former Walston Parish Church

- Population: <
- Council area: South Lanarkshire
- Lieutenancy area: Lanarkshire
- Country: Scotland
- Sovereign state: United Kingdom
- Police: Scotland
- Fire: Scottish
- Ambulance: Scottish

Walston is a hamlet in the middle of black mount area of South Lanarkshire, Scotland.

== History ==
Patrick Molleson in the Old Statistical Account records that the name sometimes used to be written as Welstoun (with a long s) and may have come from a copious spring of good water known as Walston-well. However John Wilson in the New Statistical Account suggests that the name may have come from Waldef, the brother of the Earl of Dunbar. In this theory the name started as Waldef's-toun and transformed via Walyston to Walston. John Wilson also mentions Patrick Anderson of Walston who was imprisoned on the Bass Rock for keeping conventicles and corresponding with banned ministers.

== Walston Today ==
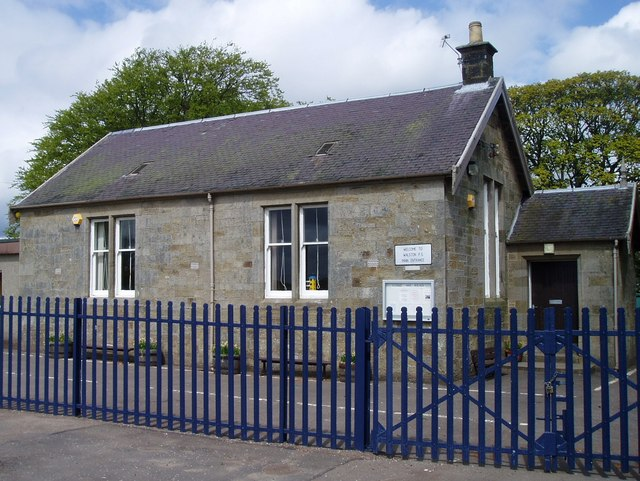
Walston Primary School

It contains a few houses and bungalows. A park and church are located at the ends. There is also a telephone box and a bed and breakfast. Walston Primary School provides an education for around 45 children aged 5 – 11. Due to the small pupil population, the classes are composite and the staff may fill multiple roles, such as janitor and chef. In 2018 plans were approved to rebuild the school in the village of Elsrickle.
