= Wendell L. Willkie School =

- Formerly listed on the U.S. National Register of Historic Places
- Location: 1630 Main St., Elwood, Indiana
- Area: 1 acre (0.40 ha)
- Built: 1893
- Architectural style: Romanesque
- NRHP reference No.: 75000029

Significant dates
- Added to NRHP: May 12, 1975
- Removed from NRHP: January 19, 1990

Wendell L. Willkie School, also known as the Central School, was a historic school building located at Elwood, Indiana. It was built between 1893 and 1895, and was originally a two-story, Romanesque Revival style stone and brick building. A third floor was added at a later date. Republican presidential candidate Wendell L. Willkie attended the school from about 1898 to 1910; it was named for him in 1944. Newer building burned June 22, 1988; older building razed same year.

It was listed on the National Register of Historic Places in 1975 and delisted in 1990.
