= Gruenewald House =

Historic house in Indiana, United States

- U.S. National Register of Historic Places
- U.S. Historic district – Contributing property
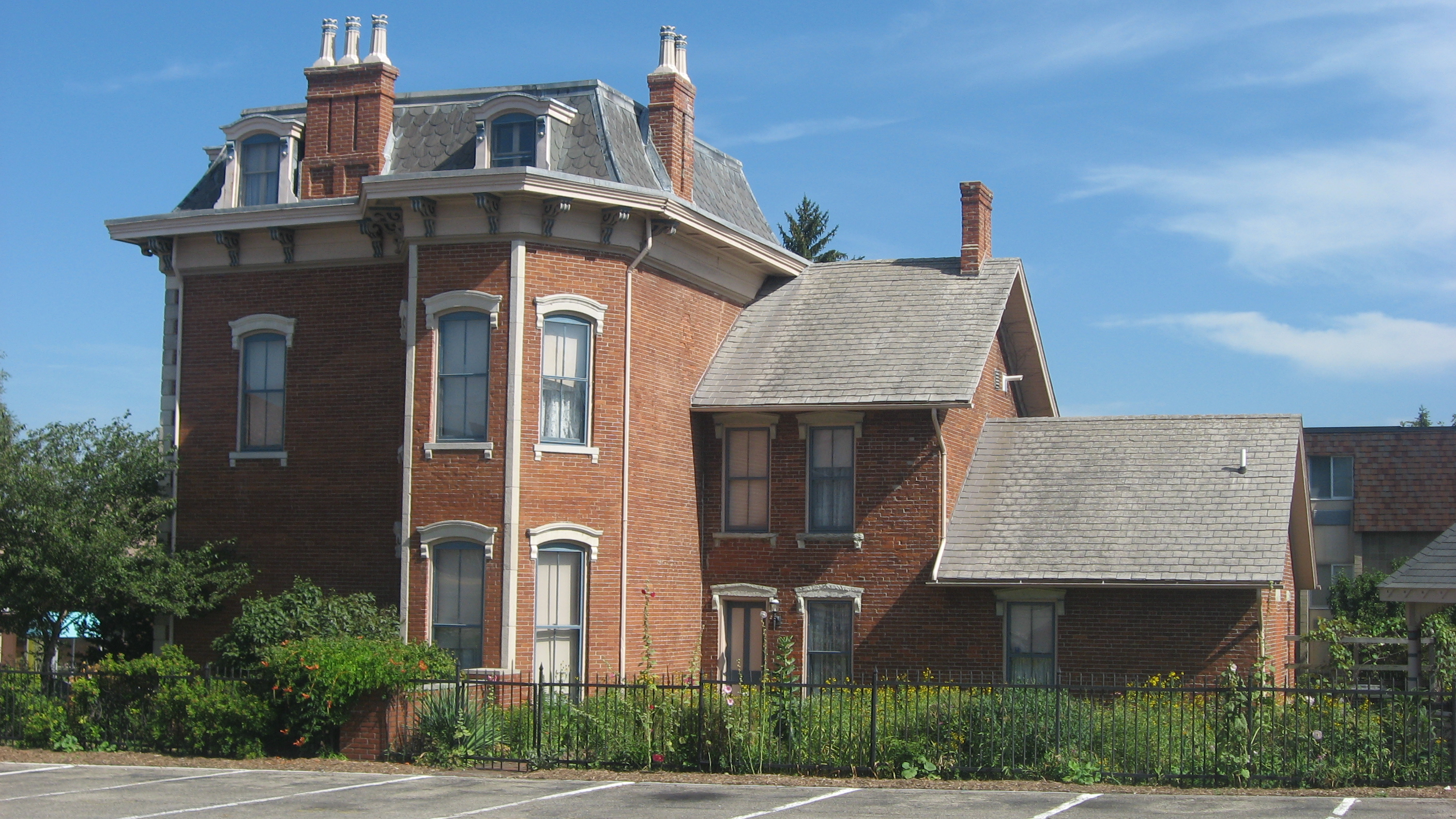
- Side of the house

- Location within Indiana Location within the United States
- Location: 626 N. Main St., Anderson, Indiana
- Coordinates: 40°6′33″N 85°40′40″W
- Area: Less than 1 acre (0.40 ha)
- Built: 1871
- Architectural style: Second Empire, Italianate
- NRHP reference No.: 76000028
- Added to NRHP: October 8, 1976

The Gruenewald House is a historic home located at 626 Main Street in downtown Anderson, Indiana. The three-story Italianate/Second Empire style house is decorated with turn-of-the century furnishings.

The house was built in two parts. The back was built in 1860; the front was added in 1873 by Moses Cherry. Martin Gruenewald, a local businessman, purchased the house shortly thereafter, and resided there for 50 years.

The house is operated as a museum. It was listed in the National Register of Historic Places in 1976. It is located in the Anderson Downtown Historic District.
