= Central Avenue School (Lakeland, Florida) =

- U.S. National Register of Historic Places
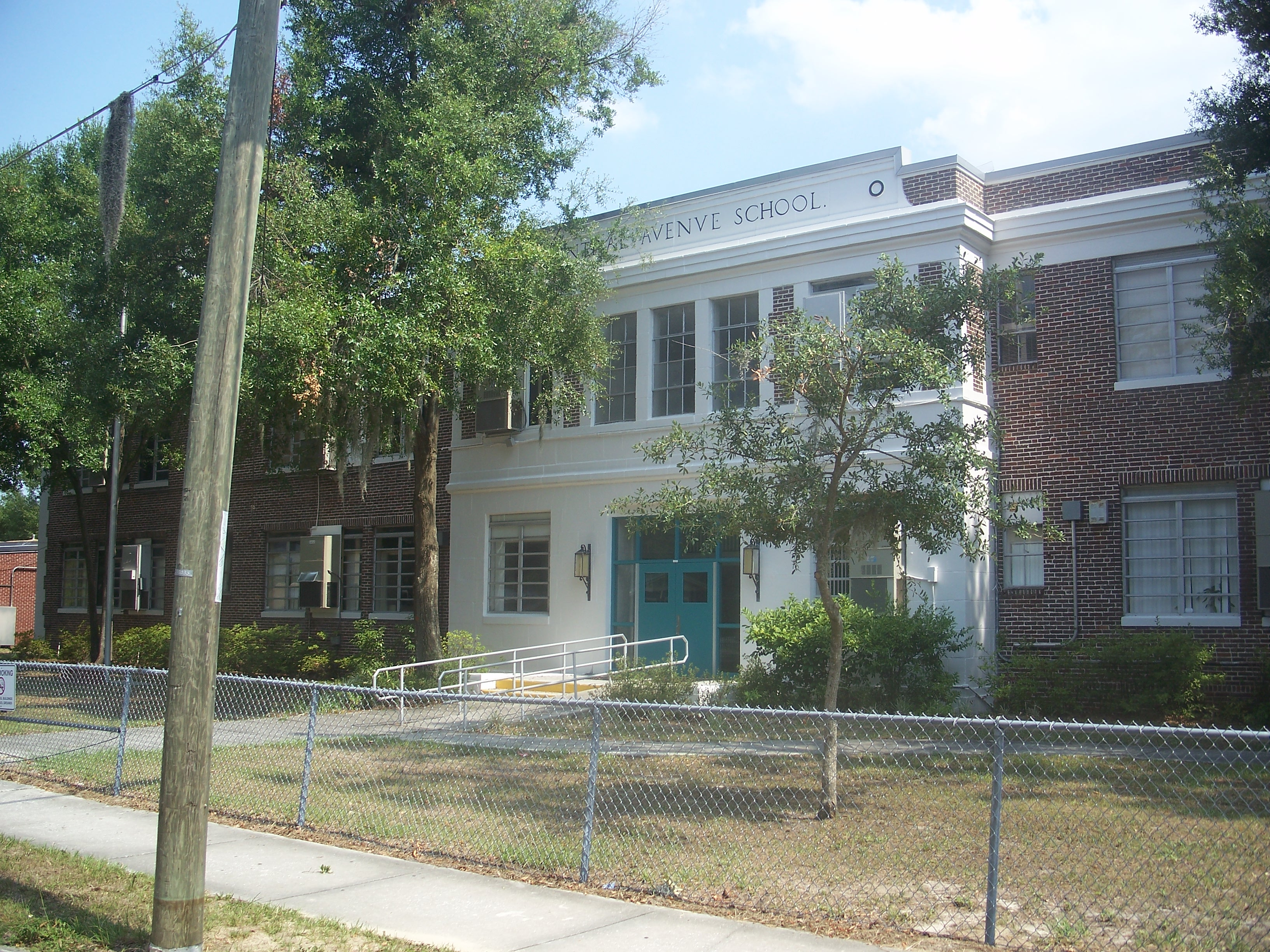

- Location within Florida Location within the United States
- Location: Polk County, Florida, USA
- Nearest city: Lakeland, Florida
- Coordinates: 28°2′5″N 81°58′23″W
- Area: 20 acres (0.081 km^{2})
- Built: 1926
- NRHP reference No.: 99000865
- Added to NRHP: 22 July 1999

The Central Avenue School (also known as the Central Avenue Elementary School) is a historic school in Lakeland, Florida, United States. It is located at 604 South Central Avenue. The school was designed by Albert Poteet and built in 1926. On July 22, 1999, it was added to the U.S. National Register of Historic Places. This building currently houses the West Area Adult School.
