= Elwood station =

- Elwood Passenger and Freight Depot
- Formerly listed on the U.S. National Register of Historic Places
- Location within Indiana Location within the United States
- Location: 16th and S. B Sts., Elwood, Indiana
- Area: less than one acre
- Built: 1894
- Architect: Norfolk & Western Railway
- Architectural style: Romanesque, Richardsonian Romanesque
- NRHP reference No.: 80000045

Significant dates
- Added to NRHP: April 3, 1980
- Removed from NRHP: March 5, 1984

Elwood Passenger and Freight Depot, also known as the Elwood Train Depot, was a historic train station located at Elwood, Indiana. It was built in 1894 by the Norfolk and Western Railway. It was a 1 1/2-story, Richardsonian Romanesque style yellow-orange brick building with a steeply pitched hipped roof. It was officially retired from service in August 1975. Passenger Depot torn down in June, 1983. The Freight Depot was burned in a control fire on January 5, 1990.

It was listed on the National Register of Historic Places in 1980 and delisted in 1984.

Preceding station	Norfolk and Western Railway	Following station
Hobbs toward Frankfort	Frankfort – Lima	Wallace toward Lima
