= West Eighth Street Historic District =

Historic district in Indiana, United States

- U.S. National Register of Historic Places
- U.S. Historic district
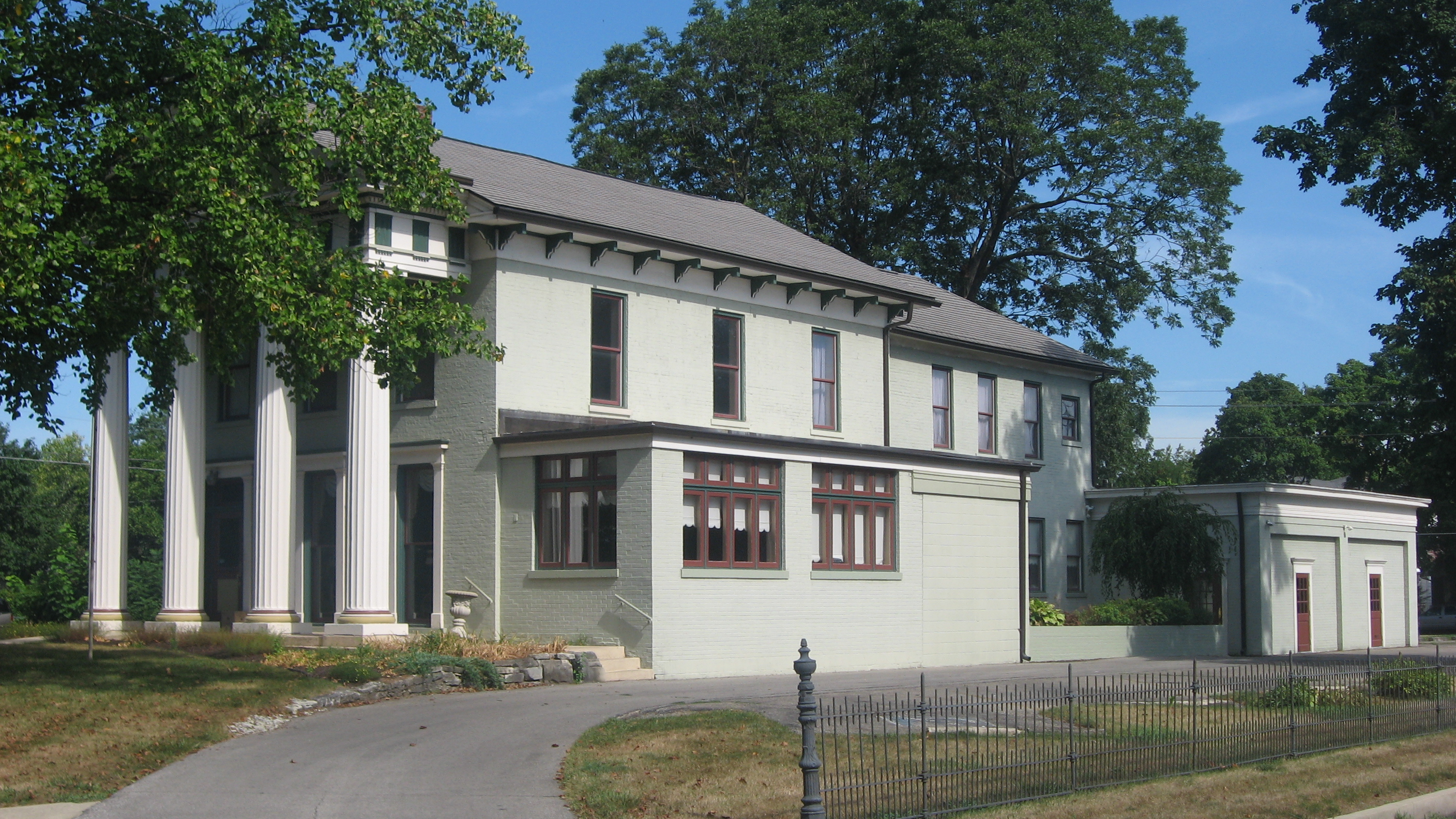
- The Neil McCullough House, a notable part of the district

- Location within Indiana Location within the United States
- Location: Roughly bounded by 7th, 9th, Jackson, and Henry Sts., Anderson, Indiana
- Coordinates: 40°6′29″N 85°41′20″W
- Area: 100 acres (40 ha)
- Architectural style: Mixed (more Than 2 Styles From Different Periods)
- NRHP reference No.: 76000029
- Added to NRHP: August 27, 1976

The West Eighth Street Historic District is a national historic district located at Anderson, Indiana. This District consists of homes, churches, parks, commercial and public buildings, that were constructed during the last decade of the nineteenth century and first decade of the twentieth century. There are approximately 200 structures in this District in styles that represent cottages of various styles, Queen Anne styles, Free Classic, Colonial Revival styles and a good collection of notable Italianate homes. Most of these homes were constructed during the gas boom in the late 1880s, and were the homes to Anderson's business, civic and governmental leaders.

It was listed in the National Register of Historic Places in 1976.
