= Tower Hotel (Anderson, Indiana) =

- U.S. National Register of Historic Places
- U.S. Historic district – Contributing property
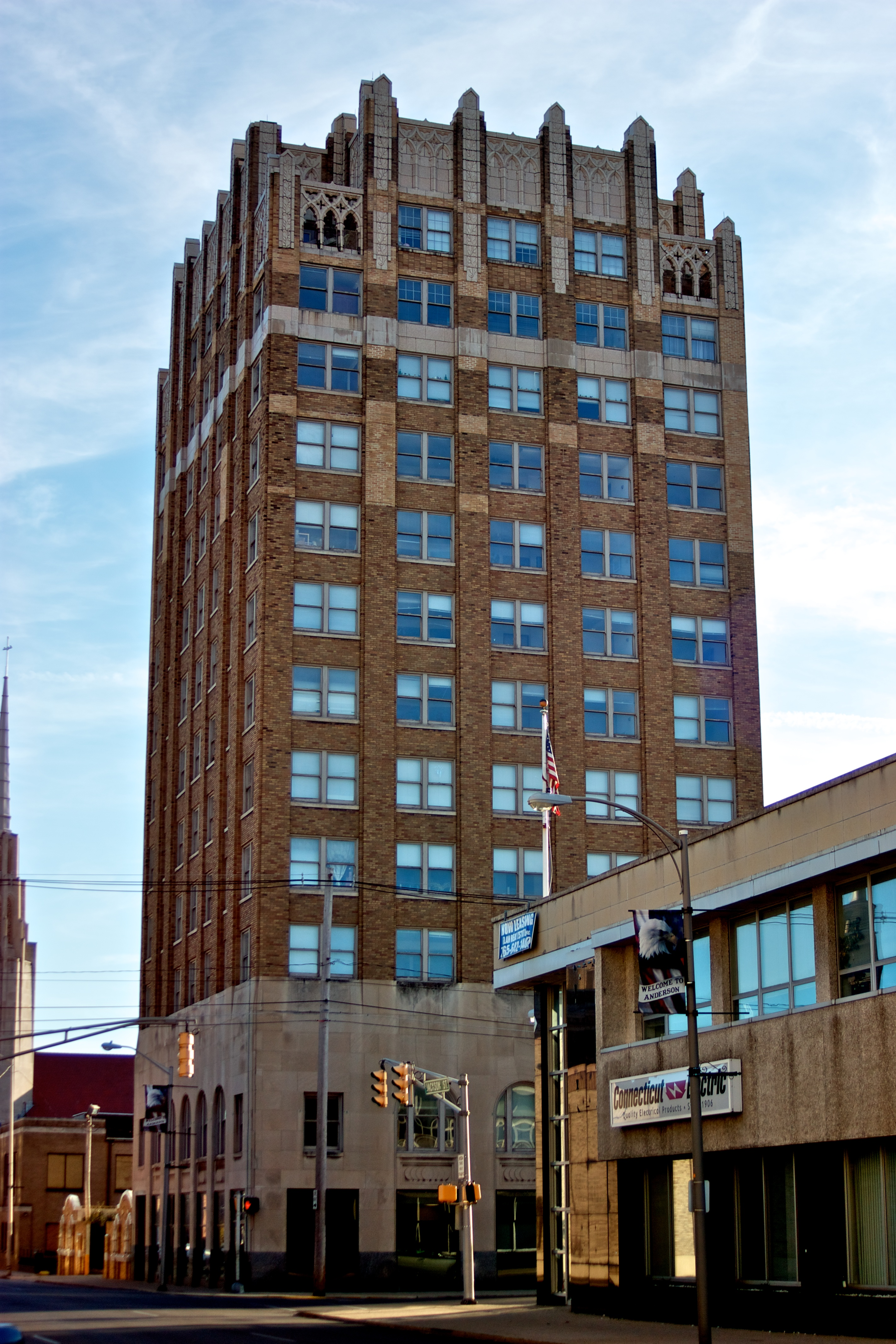
- Front and eastern side of the building

- Location within Indiana Location within the United States
- Location: 1109 Jackson St., Anderson, Indiana
- Coordinates: 40°6′18″N 85°40′52″W
- Area: Less than 1 acre (0.40 ha)
- Built: 1930
- Architect: Erwin F. Miller; A.J. Glasser Company
- Architectural style: Art Deco, Late Gothic Revival
- Part of: Anderson Downtown Historic District (ID06000307)
- NRHP reference No.: 97001180
- Added to NRHP: October 10, 1997

The Tower Hotel is a historic hotel building located on the northeast corner of W. 11th and Jackson Streets in downtown Anderson, Indiana. It is currently an apartment complex.

== History ==
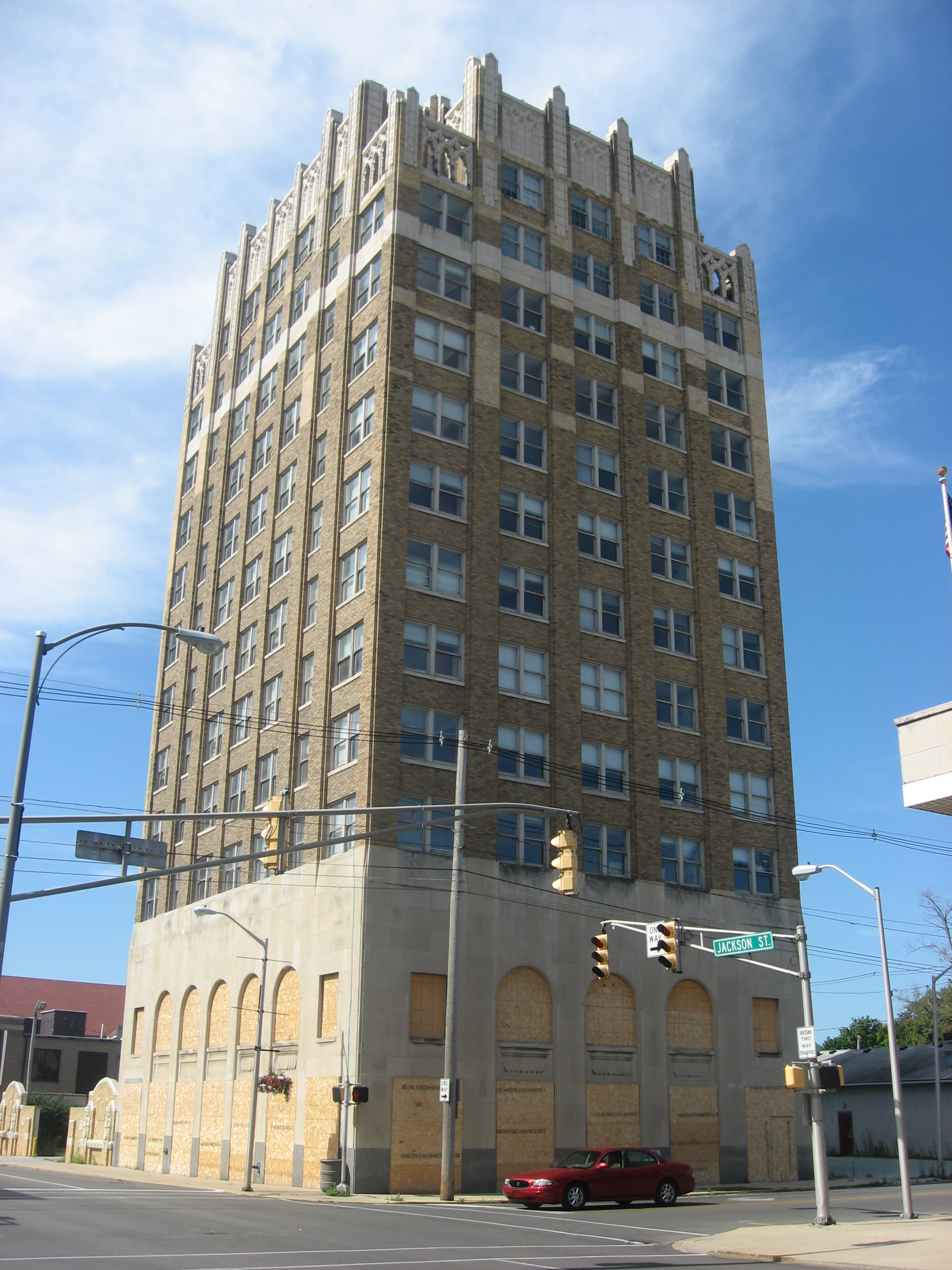

The name of the building is somewhat of a misnomer as the building never actually functioned as a hotel. If the hotel had opened it would have been part of the Pick-Wenzel chain. The hotel was to feature a complete bakery, a barber shop, a banquet hall, a business center, a large lobby and dining room. The depression struck, the building was up, but the interiors were not completed.

The building stood empty for many years, until the Gospel Trumpet bought the building and converted it into apartments.

A three-story auto hotel was built adjacent to the Tower Hotel. The auto hotel was a business concept that really never became popular, but in addition to offering parking, full maintenance service was offered for the automobile. The auto hotel was torn down in the 1990s.

In 1997, the Tower Hotel was listed on the National Register of Historic Places. It is also a part of the Anderson Downtown Historic District, which was listed on the National Register in 2006.

In late 2011, the owners of the Tower Hotel (then known as Tower Place) were forced to close when maintenance and operation costs became too much to bear. The building sat with its first two levels covered in plywood until February 2013, when it was announced the building would be sold via auction. Initial estimates had the building going for between $200,000 and $250,000. An open house was held the week before the auction to proved potential buyers with a chance to tour the building before bidding.

On February 20, 2013, The Tower Hotel was purchased by Russian-born business owner, Youri Frankine for $100,000. In his own words, "I like the property. I want to make it just like it was,”. As for the Tower's interior, Mr Frankine said, “I want the apartments to be nice, something to reflect the historic outside look of the building." He hopes the project will revitalize Anderson's downtown. That project was never completed by Frankine. The place was left in disrepair for the next owner Core Redevelopment to remodel and bring it to its always promised but never achieved glory. With $1.6 million restoration budget and help from City officials the new Tower of Anderson opened its doors to residents in the summer of 2019. Now its a luxury apartment building with 40 residential and 2 commercial spaces.
