= Central Avenue School (Anderson, Indiana) =

- U.S. National Register of Historic Places
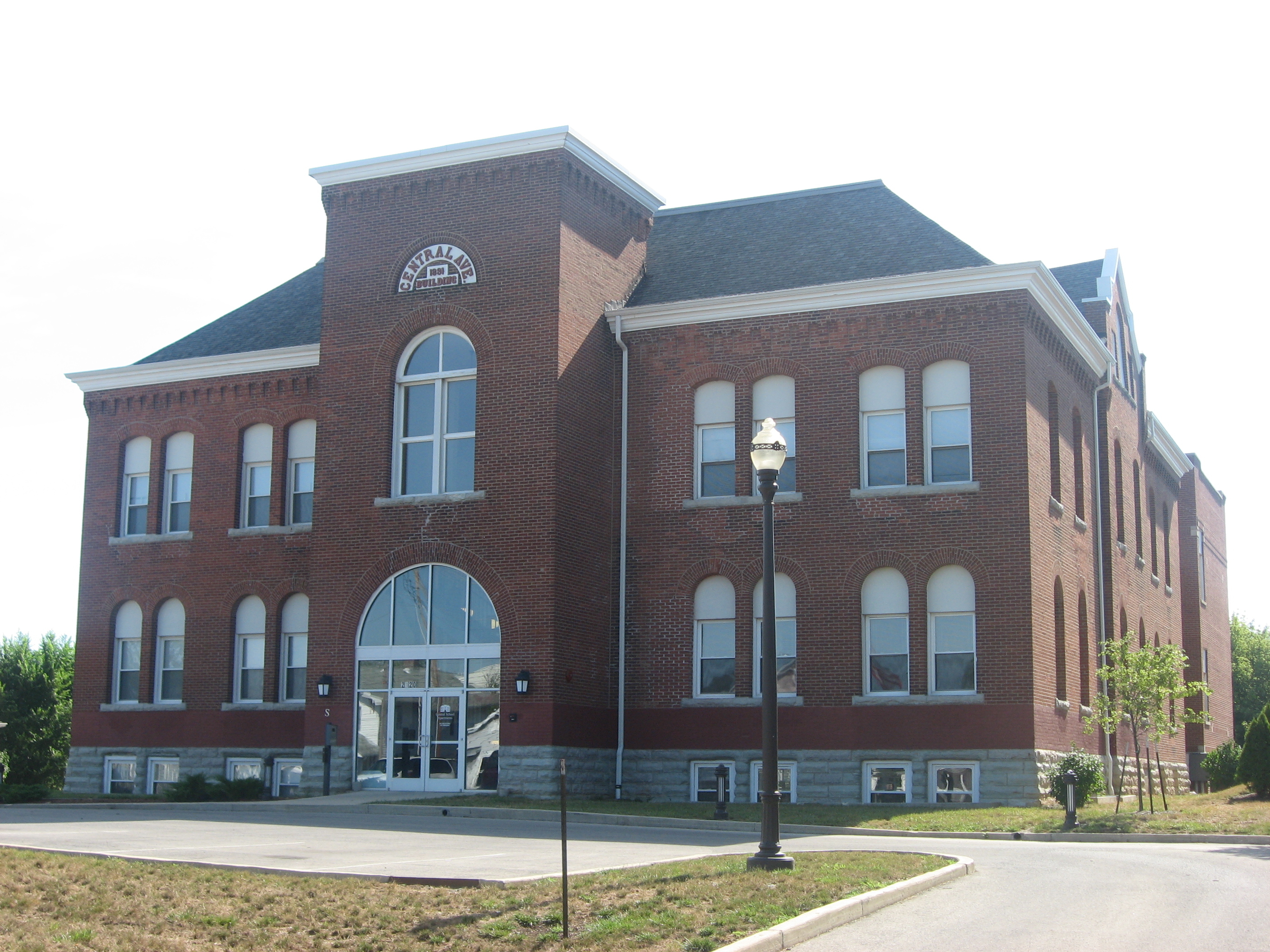
- Front and side of the school

- Location within Indiana Location within the United States
- Location: 2120 Central Ave., Anderson, Indiana
- Coordinates: 40°4′36″N 85°40′36″W
- Area: less than one acre
- Architect: Charles F. Parker, Ernest R. Watkins
- Architectural style: Romanesque, Bungalow/Craftsman
- MPS: Indiana's Public Common and High Schools MPS
- NRHP reference No.: 07000562
- Added to NRHP: June 21, 2007

The Central Avenue School is a historic school building in Anderson, Indiana, United States. It was built in 1891, and is a two-story, Romanesque Revival style brick and stone building on a raised basement. The building features two three-story towers. Attached to the original building is a Bungalow / American Craftsman style addition constructed in 1921. The building housed a school until 1974.

It was listed on the National Register of Historic Places in 2007.
