= J. Roddy Walston and the Business =

Former American rock band

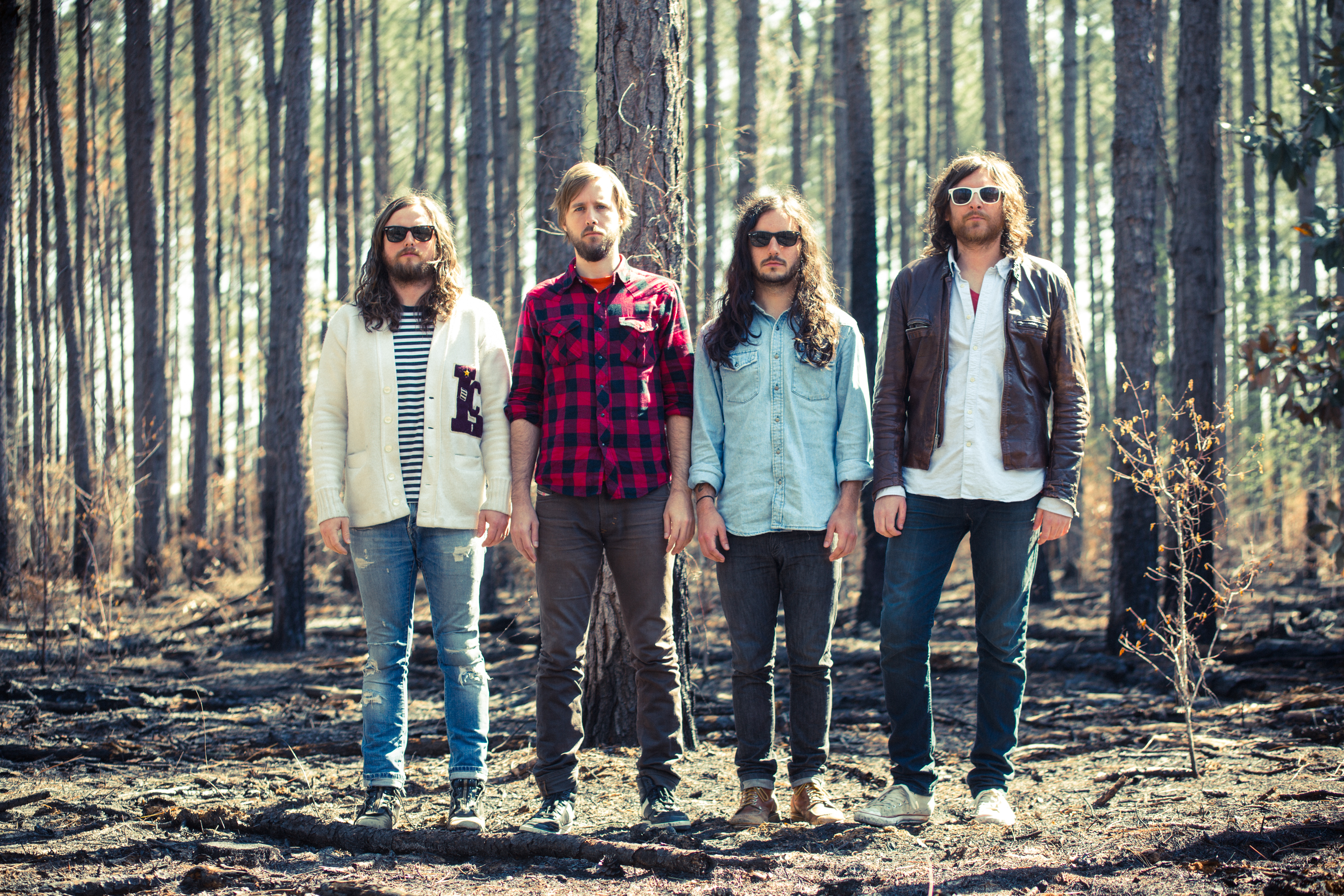

Background information
- Origin: Richmond, Virginia, U.S.
- Genres: Southern rock; roots rock; hard rock; rock and roll
- Years active: 2002–2019
- Labels: ATO; Vagrant; MapleMusic Recordings (Canada)
- Members: J. Roddy Walston; Billy Gordon; Logan Davis; Steve Colmus
- Website: www.jroddywalstonandthebusiness.com

J. Roddy Walston and the Business was an American rock band based in Richmond, Virginia, United States. The band was formed in 2002 in Cleveland, Tennessee by J. Roddy Walston (vocals/piano/guitar). The Business consisted of Billy Gordon (lead guitar/vocals), Logan Davis (bass/vocals) and Steve Colmus (drums). The band was known for their energetic live shows and Walston's pounding style of playing the piano. The group announced on their social media in late 2019 that they would disband at the close of that year.

== History ==
=== Founding, early releases ===
The original line-up of the band was convened in Walston's hometown of Cleveland, Tennessee, after a demo tape he recorded in his basement beat out 350 contenders to win a showcase on a national festival. Shortly before the festival, the band released Here Come Trouble, a seven-song EP recorded in the living room of the house Walston and his bandmates were renting.

In the Summer of 2004, the band - Walston, Nick "Two Dollar" Kaisharis (guitar/vocals), Zach Westphal (bass/vocals) and David Morton (drums) - relocated to Baltimore. The week after the band arrived, Westphal was held up at gunpoint in the parking lot of the apartment building the band lived.

In April 2005, the five-song LMNEP was released. Shortly afterwards, Kaisharis and Morton left the band, and Gordon and Colmus were recruited from other Baltimore bands. In October 2006, the new line-up released the Fierce Tiger EP featuring several new songs, as well as re-recordings of unreleased material from the band's early days.

On April 6, 2007, the band self-released their first full-length album, Hail Mega Boys, recorded at the house where Gordon was living, dubbed "The Pirate Ship". "Rock n' Roll II" was used in an episode of season four of Beverly Hills 90210, titled "Rush Hour" while "Sally Bangs," a song Walston based on a remnant of a country song his grandmother taught him (Jumpin' Bill Carlisle's "Sally Let Your Bangs Hang Down"), was used on the MTV mixed martial arts reality show Caged. "Tell You What" saw time in an episode of the Nickelodeon animated series Glenn Martin D.D.S. The song "Nineteen-aught-Four" references the Baltimore Fire of 1904, which leveled large sections of the city.

The band spent the next two years touring throughout the South, Midwest and Northeast, traveling in a church van they had purchased from a congregation in Walston's hometown and re-christened The Diaper. Kaisharis and Walston decided on the name due to the fact that "It's white, dirty and holds all of our sh--." The band left on the van the decals of its original owners - The Hamilton Cove Christian Academy of Huntsville, Alabama - in an effort to prevent both theft and speeding tickets from police officers perhaps reluctant to pull over a church van. The van, and the band's hard use of it, was profiled in the New York Times. They became noted for their manic live shows, which the Baltimore City Paper said "make James Brown look lazy." During one show aboard a boat in New York City, Walston punctuated the end of his set by throwing his piano stool through an open window and into the East River, barely missing a patron on an outside deck.

=== Vagrant Records ===
In November 2009, Walston and the Business signed to Los Angeles-based Vagrant Records, via a partnership with Fairfax Recordings. That same month, they entered Sound City studios in Van Nuys, California with producer Kevin Augunas - proprietor of Fairfax - to record their first release for the new label. Before the album was completed, bassist Westphal left the band for personal reasons and bass duties were assumed by Logan Davis, a family friend of Walston's wife who was an accomplished guitarist and bassist.

On June 21, 2010 the band attempted to play, in a single day, all 27 pianos placed in Manhattan public parks as part of British artist Luke Jerram's installation "Play Me, I'm Yours." They fell two pianos short of their goal, due to one piano remaining locked all day, and another being in constant use.

J Roddy Walston and the Business (2010) On July 27, 2010 J Roddy Walston and the Business was released in the United States on Vagrant Records and discovered shortly thereafter by PGH Live Music, located in Pittsburgh, PA. The sound was described as "What would happen if Queen and Black Oak Arkansas birthed four boys in the backwoods and let them listen to nothing but Cheap Trick and showtunes." Lead single "Don't Break the Needle" was used in the opening credits of the movie Contraband, as well as the soundtrack to the True Religion Jeans Fall 2011 collection. "Don't Break the Needle," "Pigs and Pearls" and "Brave Man's Death" were used in the MTV reality series "Caged." One of the band's touring posters was seen in the background of an episode of the CBS series "Two Broke Girls."

The release of the album saw the band's first nationwide tours, on headlining and support runs with Deer Tick, Lucero, the Drive-By Truckers, Shooter Jennings, Shovels & Rope and Jonny Fritz and the In-Laws. In the Summer of 2011, they played Bonnaroo, Lollapalooza and Austin City Limits festivals, along with the All Good Festival in Masontown, West Virginia and the Lebowski Fest in Louisville, Kentucky. They have regularly performed at SXSW in Austin, TX.

=== ATO Records and Essential Tremors (2013) ===
On Monday, March 4, 2013 the band announced via social networking that they had signed with ATO Records and were working on a new album. Essential Tremors was released on September 10, 2013 and was followed by a nationwide "Holler and Moan" tour with support from Fly Golden Eagle including a show at both weekends of Austin City Limits Music Festival.

Currently working with PGH Live Music, in the summer of 2013, the song "Use Your Language" off of the album, J Roddy Walston and the Business, appeared on the series finale of HBO's comedy television series Eastbound and Down. The instrumental start of the song played as Kenny Powers walked off the set of his show to return home.

In the fall of 2014, "Sweat Shock", the single off of Essential Tremors was featured in a Coors Light commercial.

=== Destroyers of the Soft Life (2017) ===
"The Wanting" single was released in July 2017 in advance of the band's new album, Destroyers of the Soft Life, due September 29, 2017. The band released another track from the album, called "You Know Me Better," in August 2017. The band played acoustic versions of two additional tracks from the album--"Numbers Don't Lie" and "Heart is Free"—at Electric Lady Studios in New York City on August 21, 2017.

=== Dissolution ===
In late 2019, the band announced that performances in Richmond, Virginia and Baltimore would be their final performances. Walston wrote, "There are no plans to make another album or tour at any point in 2020 or the foreseeable future. After 14 years, four albums and 889 shows of being creatively betrothed solely to each other, now feels like the time to explore other possibilities - so we’re stepping away. There will be plenty of time to talk about the last decade and a half and what comes next - and rest assured that we’ll all still be out there, and maybe even together at times."

In 2025, Walston proceeded to begin touring with a new backing band, the Automatic Band.

== Influences ==
Walston grew up singing in church in Cleveland, Tennessee, which is the home of the Church of God and its affiliated college, Lee University. Walston was steeped in gospel and country music, which he said his relatives referred to as "both kinds of music." His maternal grandmother, a country artist loosely affiliated with the Grand Ole Opry, taught him how to play piano and guitar, and she was often dismayed at his attempts to learn rock n' roll. He lists his influences as Led Zeppelin, the Rolling Stones (especially pianist Ian Stewart), Harry Nilsson, T. Rex and Leon Russell. His sound has been described as a cross between Janis Joplin and Jerry Lee Lewis.

== Equipment ==
On tour, Walston plays a 1970s Yamaha CP-60, an upright piano built for traveling bands that weighs nearly 300 pounds. Walston has said, "I don't play keyboards--I play piano. It's not like you'll tell a guitar player to play keytar."

== Discography ==
=== Studio albums ===
- Hail Mega Boys (2007)
- J Roddy Walston and the Business (2010)
- Essential Tremors (2013)
- Destroyers of the Soft Life (2017)

=== Singles and EPs ===
- LMNEP (2005)
- Brave Man's Death / Don't Break The Needle (2010)
- Heavy Bells (2014)
- The Wanting (2017)

=== Unchecked ===
- Here Come Trouble (2002)
- Fierce Tiger (EP) (2006)

=== Singles ===
List of singles, with selected chart positions
Title	Year	Peak chart positions			Album
Title	Year	US Alt.	US Main.	US Rock Air.	Album
"Heavy Bells"	2013	13	33	28	Essential Tremors
"Take It As It Comes"	2014	16	—	—	Essential Tremors
"Sweat Shock"	2015	—	—	—	Essential Tremors
"The Wanting"	2017	22	—	—	Destroyers of the Soft Life
"—" denotes a recording that did not chart in that territory.
