= Anderson, Indiana =

- City
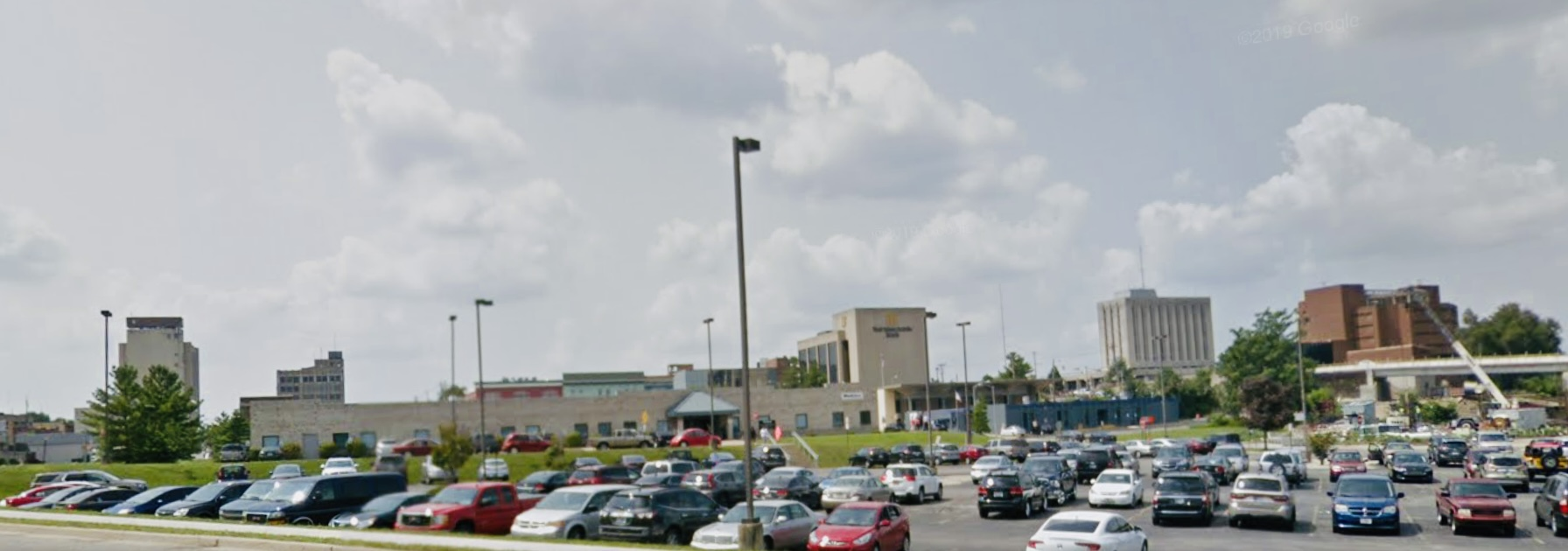
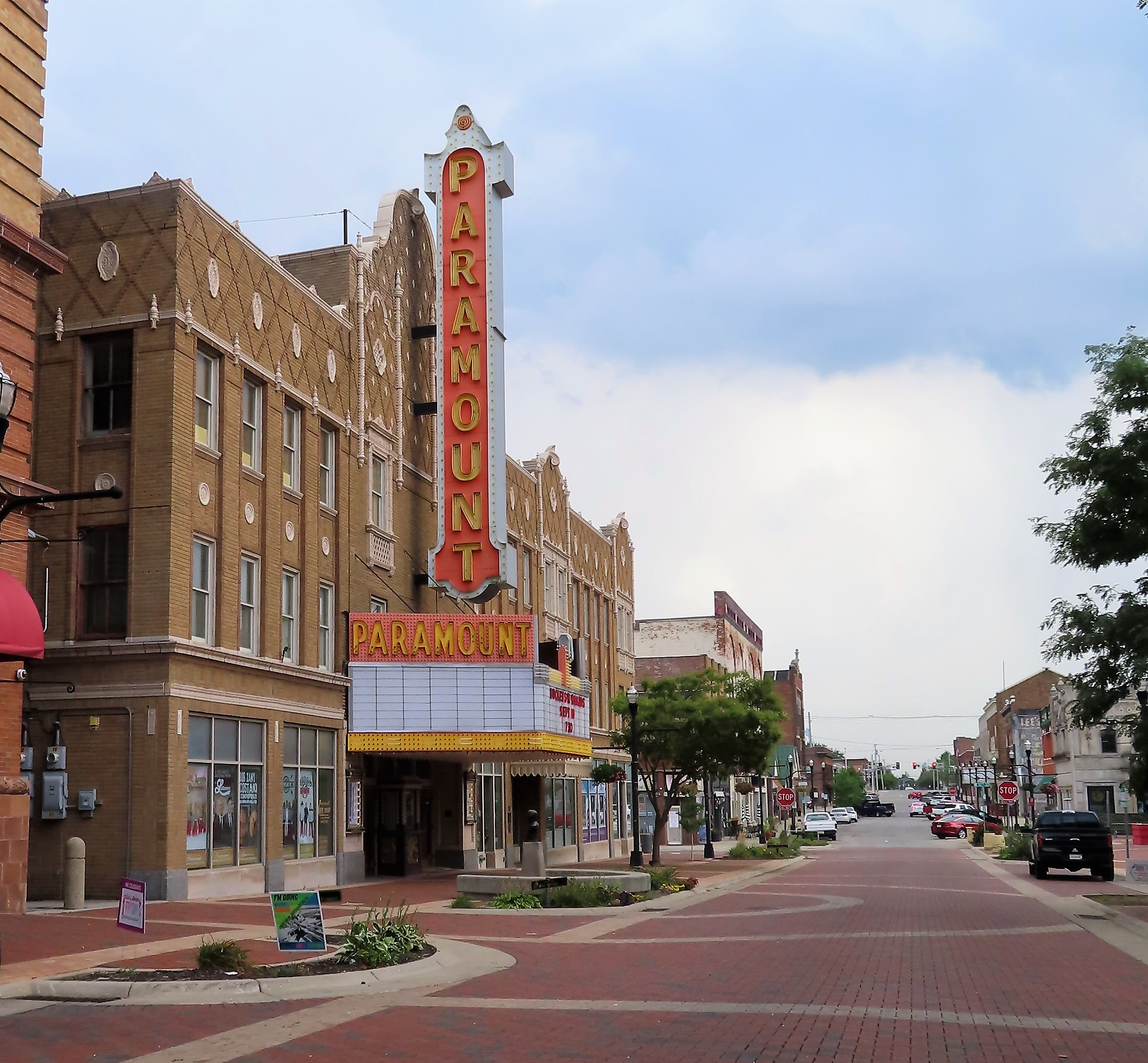
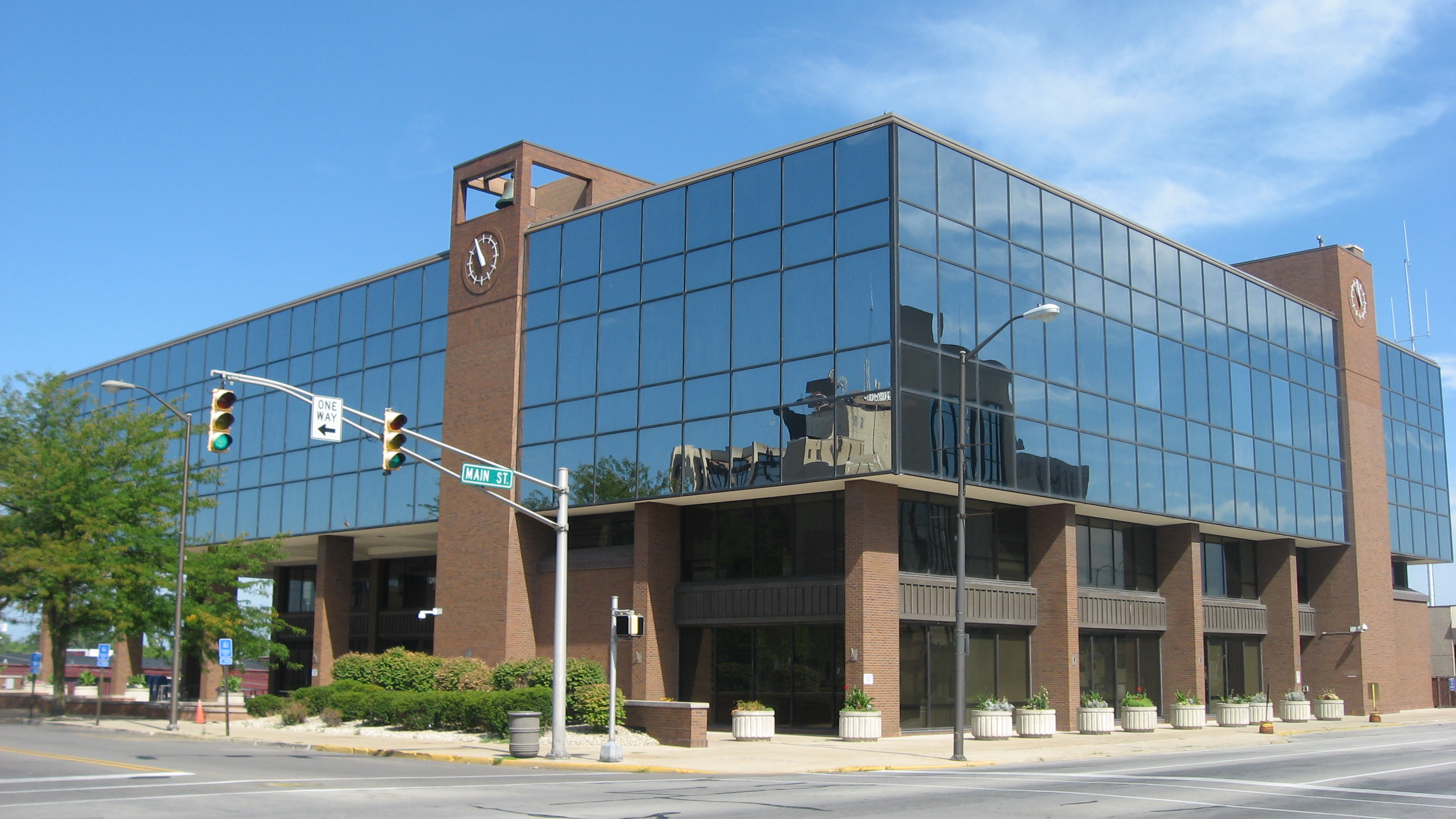
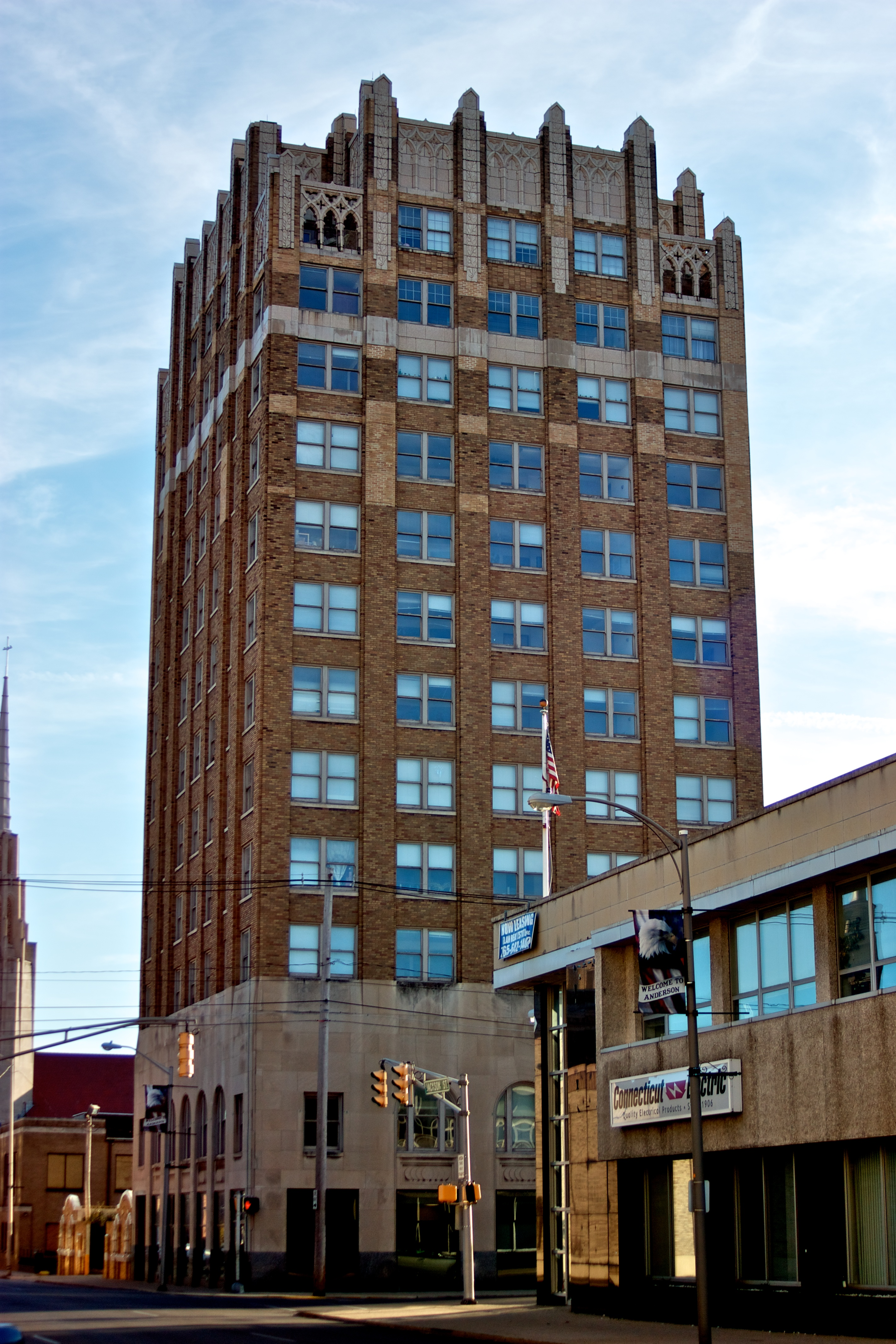
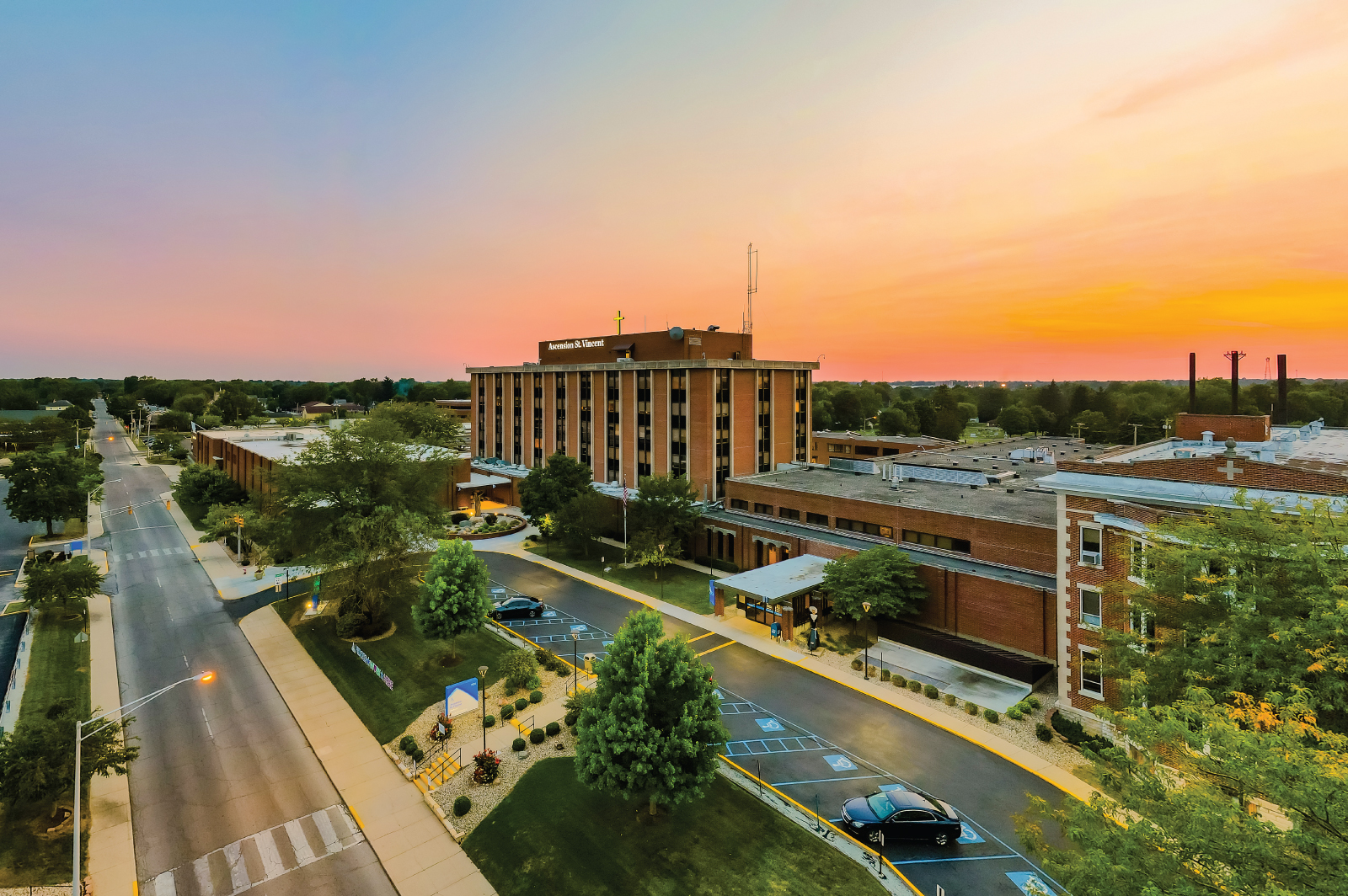
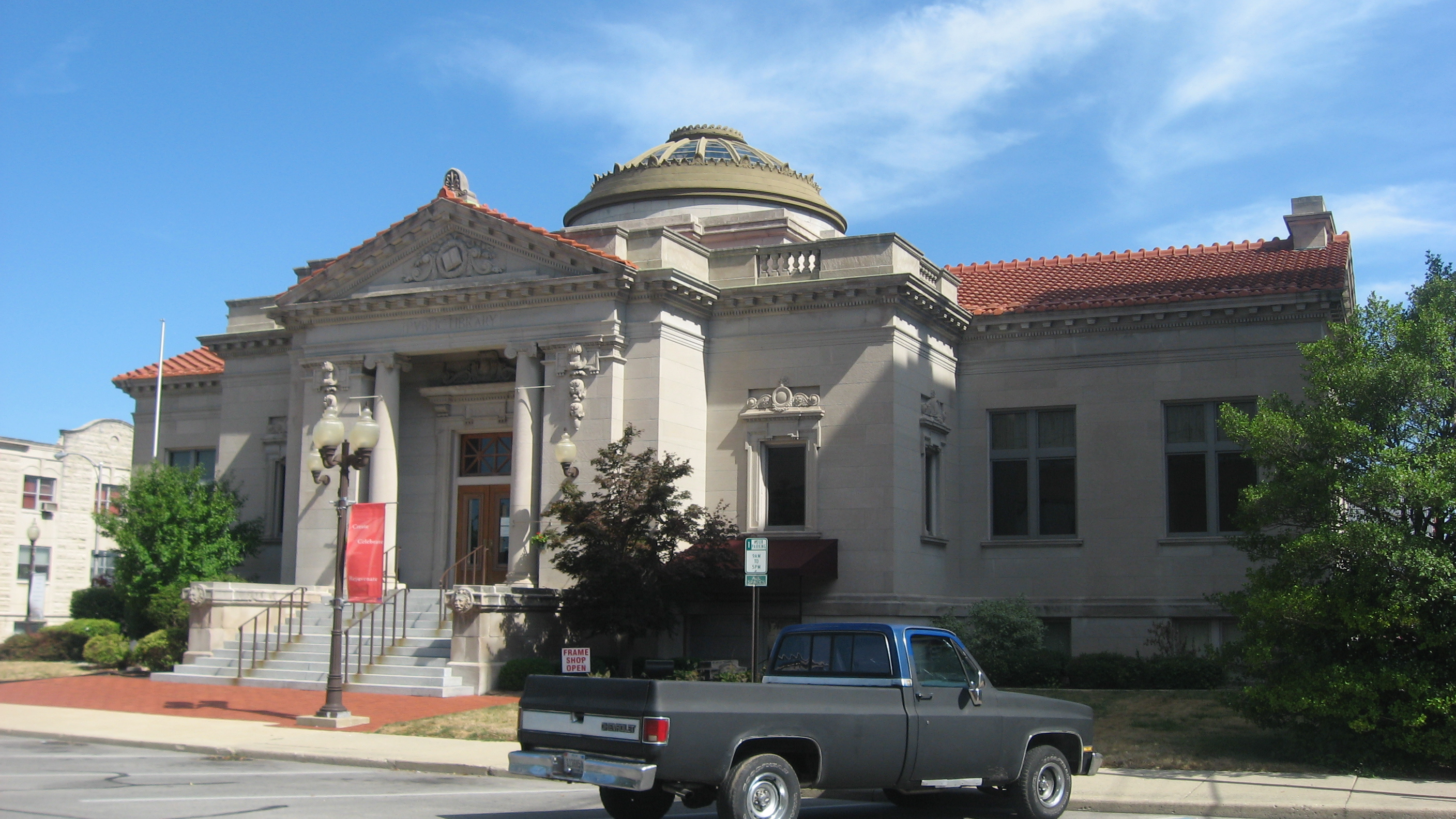
- Downtown Anderson Paramount Theatre Madison County Courthouse The Tower Ascension (healthcare system) Anderson Museum of Art

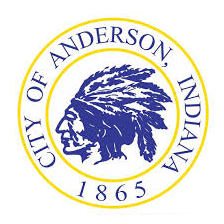
- Seal
- Nickname: "Queen City of the Gas Belt"
- Motto: Performance. Talent. Inspiration.
- Location in Madison County, Indiana.

- Location within Indiana Location within the United States Location within North America
- Coordinates: 40°06′20″N 85°41′20″W
- Country: United States
- State: Indiana
- County: Madison
- Townships: Anderson (primarily); Adams, Fall Creek, Lafayette, Richland, Union (small sections)

Government
  - Mayor: Thomas Broderick Jr. (D)

Area
  - Total: 41.71 sq mi (108.04 km^{2})
  - Land: 41.60 sq mi (107.74 km^{2})
  - Water: 0.11 sq mi (0.29 km^{2})
- Elevation: 863 ft (263 m)

Population (2020)
  - Total: 54,788
  - Estimate (2025): 55,703 ▲
  - Density: 1,317.1/sq mi (508.52/km^{2})
- Time zone: UTC−5 (EST)
  - Summer (DST): UTC−4 (EDT)
- ZIP codes: 46011, 46012, 46013, 46016, 46017
- Area code: 765
- FIPS code: 18-01468
- GNIS ID: 2393952
- Website: www.cityofanderson.com

Anderson is a city in and the county seat of Madison County, Indiana, United States. The population was 54,788 at the 2020 census. It is named after Chief William Anderson. The city is the headquarters of the Church of God and its Anderson University. Highlights of the city include the historic Paramount Theatre and the Gruenewald House.

== History ==
Prior to the organization of Madison County, William Conner entered the land upon which Anderson is located. Conner later sold the ground to John and Sarah Berry, who donated 32 acres (13 ha) of their land to Madison County on the condition that the county seat be moved from Pendleton to Anderson. John Berry laid out the first plat of Anderson on November 7, 1827. In 1828 the seat of justice was moved from Pendleton to Anderson.

The city is named for Chief William "Adam" Anderson, whose mother was Lenape and whose father was of Swedish descent. Chief Anderson's name in Lenape was Kikthawenund, meaning "creaking boughs". The Lenape village was known as "Anderson's Town", though the Moravian missionaries called it "The Heathen Town Four Miles Away". Anderson was also known as "Andersonton" before being formally organized as Anderson.

Introduction of internal improvements by the Mammoth Internal Improvement Act caused a growth in the population in 1837. In December 1838, Anderson was incorporated as a town with 350 inhabitants. The Central Canal, a branch of the Wabash and Erie Canal, was planned to come through Anderson. Work continued on the canal during 1838 and the beginning of 1839, but the work was soon suspended by the state following effects of the Panic of 1837. The town again became a sleepy village until 1849, when it was incorporated a second time as a town. Many new commercial ventures located around the courthouse square.

This incorporation was short-lived, and Anderson once again went back to village status in 1852. However, with the completion of the Indianapolis Bellefontaine Railroad, as well as their station in 1852, Anderson burst to life. The third incorporation of Anderson as a town occurred on June 9, 1853. The population continued to increase. On August 28, 1865, with a population of nearly 1,300 people, Anderson was incorporated as a city.

Between 1853 and the late 19th century, twenty industries of various sizes located there. On March 31, 1887, natural gas was discovered in Anderson. As the Indiana gas boom began, this discovery led new businesses that could use natural gas, such as glass-making, to move to the city. Anderson grew to such proportions that a Cincinnati newspaper editor labeled the city "The Pittsburgh on White River". Other appellations were "Queen City of the Gas Belt" and (because of the vulcanizing and rubber tire manufacturing business) "Puncture Proof City".

In 1897 the Interurban Railroad was born in Anderson. Charles Henry, a large stock holder, coined the term "Interurban" in 1893. It continued to operate until 1941. The Commercial Club (formed on November 18, 1905) was the forerunner of the present chamber of commerce.

The year 1912 spelled disaster for Anderson: the natural gas ran out. The city had left its gas-powered lights on day and night, and there are stories of a pocket of natural gas being lit in the river and burning for a prolonged period for the spectacle of it. The result of the loss of natural gas was that several factories moved out. The whole city slowed down.

This club persuaded the Remy brothers to stay in Anderson and others to locate there. For decades, Delco Remy and Guide Lamp (later Fisher Guide), which during World War II built the M3 submachine gun and the FP-45 Liberator pistol for the Allies, were the top two employers in the city. From 1913 through the 1950s, the Ward-Stilson Company was one of the country's largest producers of uniforms, regalia, furniture and props for the Freemasons, the Odd Fellows, and dozens of other U.S. fraternal organizations.

The Church of God of Anderson located its world headquarters in Anderson in 1905. Anderson Bible School was opened in 1917, and this was separated from Gospel Trumpet (now known as Warner Press) in 1925. At the same time, it became known as Anderson Bible School and Seminary. In 1925, the name was changed to Anderson College and eventually to Anderson University in 1988.

Over the years, 17 different types of automobiles were manufactured in Anderson, with the Lambert family among the city's leaders in its development and the Buckeye Gasoline Buggy the Lambert product. Many other inventions were perfected in Anderson, including the gas regulator (Miron G. Reynolds), the stamp vending machine (Frank P. Dunn), clothes presser (H. Donald Forse), "Irish Mail" handcars (Hugh Hill), flower car for funeral homes (Francis M. McClain, automatic gearshift (Von D. Polhemus)), Sisson choke (Glenn Sisson), and the vulcanizing process to retread tires (Charles E. Miller).

Anderson hosted a National Basketball Association (NBA) franchise for the 1949–50 season, being one of the smaller cities to have had a major league franchise in a Big Four American sport. The Anderson Packers were a founding member of the NBA (under that name), but folded after one season.

Like most other industrial cities in Indiana and the Rust Belt as a whole, Anderson suffered tremendously from deindustrialization in the 1970s and 1980s. For example, nearly 22,000 people were employed by General Motors in the 1970s in Anderson; by 2006 this number had declined to fewer than 2,600. Anderson has since struggled with higher rates of poverty and unemployment.

== Geography ==
Anderson is located in south-central Madison County at 40°06′00″N 85°40′53″W. The city of Anderson occupies all of Anderson Township except for the much smaller communities of Country Club Heights, Edgewood, River Forest, and Woodlawn Heights, as well as small parts of five other townships: Lafayette, Richland, Union, Adams, and Fall Creek.

Indiana State Road 32 (14th Street) crosses the city center, leading east-northeast 19 miles (31 km) to Muncie and west-southwest the same distance to Noblesville. State Road 9 (Scatterfield Road) crosses the east side of the city, leading north 11 miles (18 km) to Alexandria and southwest 10 miles (16 km) to Pendleton. Interstate 69 crosses the southeast corner of the city, with access from Exit 226 (SR 9/SR 109). I-69 leads southwest 40 miles (64 km) to Indianapolis and northeast 83 miles (134 km) to Fort Wayne.

According to the U.S. Census Bureau, Anderson has a total area of 41.7 square miles (108.00 km^{2}), of which 41.6 square miles (108 km^{2}) are land and 0.1 square miles (0.3 km^{2}), or 0.27%, are water. The White River flows east to west through the northern part of the city.

=== Climate ===
Climate data for Anderson(Sewage PLT)-2006-2020 normals
Month	Jan	Feb	Mar	Apr	May	Jun	Jul	Aug	Sep	Oct	Nov	Dec	Year
Mean daily maximum °F (°C)	35.4 (1.9)	38.2 (3.4)	50.8 (10.4)	62.8 (17.1)	73.3 (22.9)	81.5 (27.5)	83.9 (28.8)	82.4 (28.0)	76.9 (24.9)	64.9 (18.3)	50.9 (10.5)	40.2 (4.6)	61.8 (16.5)
Daily mean °F (°C)	28.1 (−2.2)	30.3 (−0.9)	41.9 (5.5)	52.4 (11.3)	63.4 (17.4)	71.9 (22.2)	74.3 (23.5)	72.8 (22.7)	66.9 (19.4)	55.2 (12.9)	42.6 (5.9)	33.3 (0.7)	52.8 (11.5)
Mean daily minimum °F (°C)	20.8 (−6.2)	22.3 (−5.4)	33.1 (0.6)	42.1 (5.6)	53.4 (11.9)	62.2 (16.8)	64.8 (18.2)	63.3 (17.4)	56.9 (13.8)	45.4 (7.4)	34.3 (1.3)	26.4 (−3.1)	43.8 (6.5)
Average precipitation inches (mm)	2.79 (71)	3.03 (77)	4.15 (105)	4.73 (120)	4.38 (111)	5.89 (150)	3.94 (100)	3.64 (92)	2.92 (74)	3.70 (94)	3.57 (91)	3.54 (90)	46.28 (1,175)
Average snowfall inches (cm)	7.0 (18)	6.6 (17)	1.6 (4.1)	0.2 (0.51)	trace	0.0 (0.0)	0.0 (0.0)	0.0 (0.0)	0.0 (0.0)	trace	0.4 (1.0)	5.1 (13)	20.9 (53.61)
Average extreme snow depth inches (cm)	5 (13)	4 (10)	2 (5.1)	0 (0)	0 (0)	0 (0)	0 (0)	0 (0)	0 (0)	0 (0)	0 (0)	4 (10)	5 (13)
Average precipitation days (≥ 0.01 Inches)	10	8	11	12	13	12	9	8	8	11	9	10	121
Average snowy days (≥ 0.1 Inches)	4	4	1	0	0	0	0	0	0	0	0	3	12
Average relative humidity (%)	71	68	67	65	67	68	69	68	64	65	70	73	68
Mean monthly sunshine hours	114.7	138.4	186	210	266.6	306	313.1	294.5	246	204.6	156	127.1	2,563
Mean daily sunshine hours	3.7	4.9	6	7	8.6	10.2	10.1	9.5	8.2	6.6	5.2	4.1	7.0
Mean daily daylight hours	9.7	10.7	12	13.3	14.4	15	14.7	13.7	12.4	11.1	10	9.4	12.2
Average ultraviolet index	2	2	3	4	5	6	6	6	4	2	2	2	4
Source 1: NOAA NCEI National Weather Service(Snow-Precipitation days)
Source 2: Weather Atlas(Sun-daylight-UV) climate data (Humidity)

Climate data for Anderson, Indiana
Month	Jan	Feb	Mar	Apr	May	Jun	Jul	Aug	Sep	Oct	Nov	Dec	Year
Record high °F (°C)	69 (21)	72 (22)	85 (29)	90 (32)	96 (36)	104 (40)	105 (41)	102 (39)	103 (39)	92 (33)	81 (27)	75 (24)	105 (41)
Mean daily maximum °F (°C)	32.3 (0.2)	36.5 (2.5)	48.1 (8.9)	60.7 (15.9)	71.6 (22.0)	80.6 (27.0)	83.7 (28.7)	81.6 (27.6)	75.7 (24.3)	63.9 (17.7)	50.4 (10.2)	37.1 (2.8)	60.2 (15.7)
Mean daily minimum °F (°C)	17.4 (−8.1)	20.9 (−6.2)	31.5 (−0.3)	40.3 (4.6)	50 (10)	59.3 (15.2)	63.2 (17.3)	61.1 (16.2)	54.3 (12.4)	43.1 (6.2)	34.4 (1.3)	23.5 (−4.7)	41.6 (5.3)
Record low °F (°C)	−24 (−31)	−19 (−28)	−7 (−22)	16 (−9)	23 (−5)	36 (2)	42 (6)	39 (4)	26 (−3)	15 (−9)	−4 (−20)	−22 (−30)	−24 (−31)
Average rainfall inches (cm)	2 (5.1)	2.2 (5.6)	3.5 (8.9)	4 (10)	3.8 (9.7)	3.5 (8.9)	4.1 (10)	3.4 (8.6)	3.1 (7.9)	2.6 (6.6)	3.3 (8.4)	3.1 (7.9)	38.6 (97.6)
Average snowfall inches (cm)	6 (15)	5.7 (14)	2.3 (5.8)	0.3 (0.76)	0 (0)	0 (0)	0 (0)	0 (0)	0 (0)	0 (0)	0.8 (2.0)	4.8 (12)	19.2 (49)
Source 1:
Source 2:

== Demographics ==
Historical population
Census	Pop.	Note	%±
1850	383		—
1860	1,196		212.3%
1870	3,126		161.4%
1880	4,126		32.0%
1890	10,741		160.3%
1900	20,178		87.9%
1910	22,476		11.4%
1920	29,767		32.4%
1930	39,804		33.7%
1940	41,572		4.4%
1950	46,820		12.6%
1960	49,061		4.8%
1970	70,787		44.3%
1980	64,695		−8.6%
1990	59,459		−8.1%
2000	59,734		0.5%
2010	56,129		−6.0%
2020	54,788		−2.4%
2025 (est.)	55,703		1.7%
Source: US Census Bureau

=== 2020 census ===
As of the 2020 census, Anderson had a population of 54,788. The median age was 39.9 years. 21.6% of residents were under the age of 18 and 19.1% of residents were 65 years of age or older. For every 100 females there were 92.8 males, and for every 100 females age 18 and over there were 89.3 males age 18 and over.

97.9% of residents lived in urban areas, while 2.1% lived in rural areas.

There were 23,484 households in Anderson, of which 26.1% had children under the age of 18 living in them. Of all households, 32.3% were married-couple households, 22.8% were households with a male householder and no spouse or partner present, and 35.5% were households with a female householder and no spouse or partner present. About 36.3% of all households were made up of individuals and 15.3% had someone living alone who was 65 years of age or older.

There were 27,250 housing units, of which 13.8% were vacant. The homeowner vacancy rate was 2.3% and the rental vacancy rate was 11.1%.

Racial composition as of the 2020 census
Race	Number	Percent
White	40,187	73.4%
Black or African American	7,981	14.6%
American Indian and Alaska Native	256	0.5%
Asian	329	0.6%
Native Hawaiian and Other Pacific Islander	14	0.0%
Some other race	2,252	4.1%
Two or more races	3,769	6.9%
Hispanic or Latino (of any race)	4,163	7.6%

=== 2010 census ===
As of the 2010 census, there were people, households, and families living in the city. The population density was 1,356.8 inhabitants per square mile (523.9/km^{2}). There were housing units at an average density of 675.7 per square mile (260.9/km^{2}). The racial makeup of the city was 78.8% White, 15.2% African American, 0.3% Native American, 0.5% Asian, 2.6% from other races, and 2.6% from two or more races. Hispanic or Latino of any race were 4.8% of the population.

Of the extant households 28.8% had children under the age of 18 living with them, 35.8% were married couples living together, 17.1% had a female householder with no husband present, 5.5% had a male householder with no wife present, and 41.6% were non-families. 34.5% of all households were made up of individuals, and 13.8% had someone living alone who was 65 years of age or older. The average household size was 2.28 and the average family size was 2.91.

The median age in the city was 37.8 years. 22.4% of residents were under the age of 18; 11.5% were between the ages of 18 and 24; 24.8% were from 25 to 44; 24.9% were from 45 to 64; and 16.3% were 65 years of age or older. The gender makeup of the city was 47.9% male and 52.1% female.

=== 2000 census ===
As of the 2000 census, there were people, households, and families living in the city. The population density was 1,491.6 inhabitants per square mile (575.9/km^{2}). There were housing units at an average density of 690.3 per square mile (266.5/km^{2}). The racial makeup of the city was 81.99% White, 14.88% African American, 0.31% Native American, 0.49% Asian, 0.02% Pacific Islander, 0.86% from other races, and 1.45% from two or more races. Hispanic or Latino of any race were 2.07% of the population.

There were 25,274 households, out of which 27.0% had children under the age of 18 living with them, 41.4% were married couples living together, 15.1% had a female householder with no husband present, and 39.0% were non-families. 33.1% of all households were made up of individuals, and 14.0% had someone living alone who was 65 years of age or older. The average household size was 2.28 and the average family size was 2.87.

In the city, the age distribution of the population shows 23.2% under the age of 18, 11.2% from 18 to 24, 27.6% from 25 to 44, 21.3% from 45 to 64, and 16.6% who were 65 years of age or older. The median age was 36 years. For every 100 females, there

== Government ==
The city government consists of a mayor and a city council. The mayor is elected in citywide vote. The city council consists of nine members. Six are elected from individual districts. Three members are elected at large.

== Economy ==
When General Motors closed its operations in Anderson, the city was dealt a major economic blow, as GM was the biggest employer in Anderson. Nevertheless, in 2007, Anderson was ranked 98th in the Forbes List for 100 Best Places for Businesses among Smaller U.S. Metro areas. However, a more recent (2014) appraisal of Anderson from the Indiana Business Review was mixed, noting that "long-term trends are negative", citing "a long-term downward trend in area employment" and "acceleration in the number of food stamp recipients". More recent unemployment has been reduced, but improvements still lag behind the rest of the state.

For 2013, estimated household median income was $33,574 (vs. Indiana state median of $48,248). Per capita money income was $18,216 (Indiana per capita of $24,635). 25.8% of the city's population was estimated at living below poverty level, vs. a statewide estimation of 15.4%. Madison County, of which Anderson is the seat, has nearly three times as many food stamps recipients per capita as does Indiana as a whole.

As of February 2019, the ten largest employers in Madison County were:

Rank	Employer	# of employees
1	Community Hospital Anderson	1,980
2	St. Vincent Health	1,410
3	Nestlé	790
4	Hoosier Park	785
5	Carter Express	680
6	Anderson University	530
7	Continuum	500
8	Kroger/Pay Less Super Markets	440
9	Greenville Technology Inc.	395
10	Walmart	365

== Points of interest ==
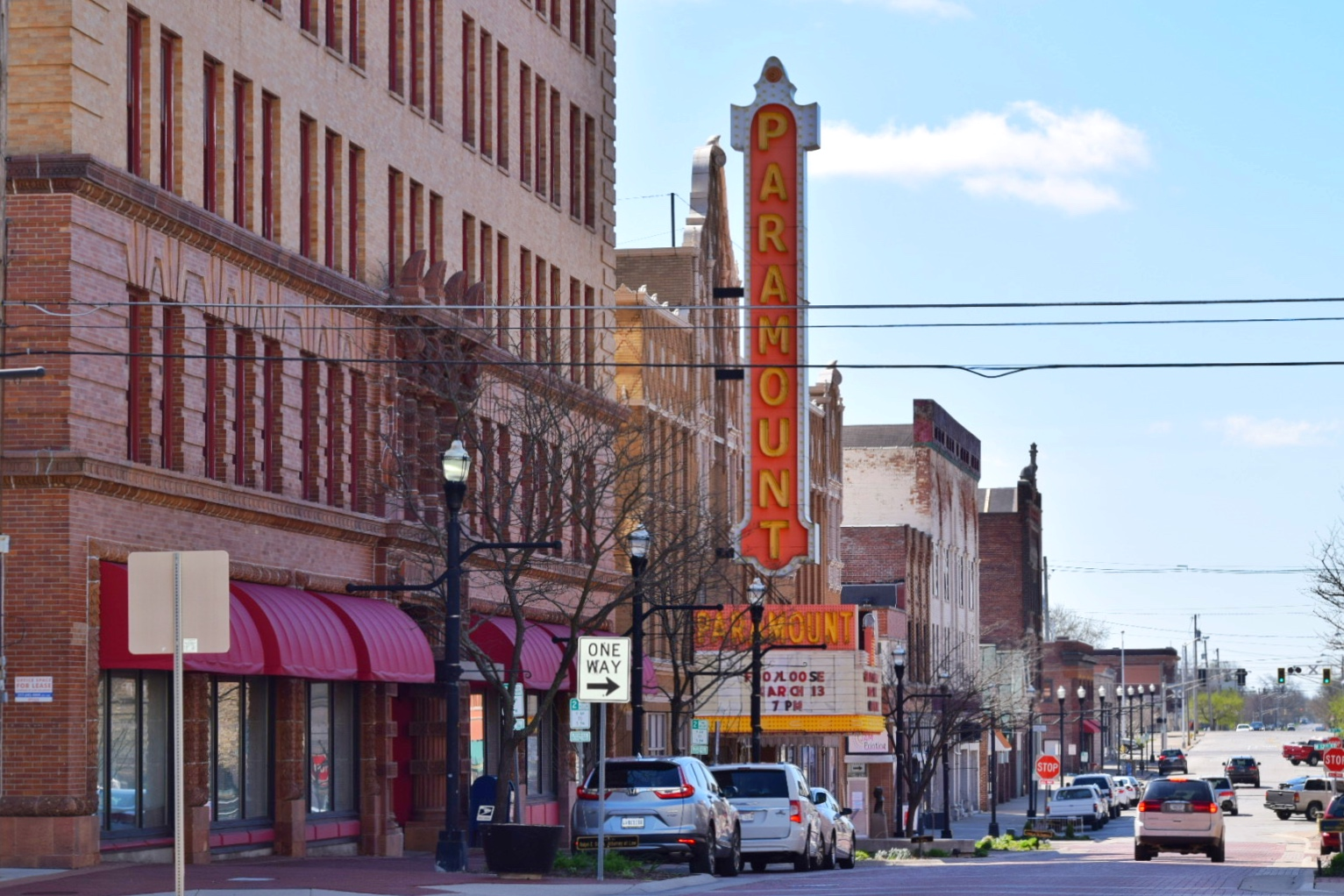
Paramount Theatre

- Anderson Center for the Arts (listed on the National Register of Historic Places)
- Anderson Speedway, home of the Pay Less Little 500 and Redbud 400
- Downtown Historic District (NRHP-listed)
- Hoosier Park Racing and Casino
- Madison County Historical Center
- Mounds State Park (NRHP-listed), adjacent to the eastern border of the city
- Paramount Theatre (NRHP-listed)
- Shadyside Memorial Park and Lake
- Additional locations on the National Register of Historic Places:
  - Anderson Bank Building
  - Central Avenue School
  - Gruenewald House
  - Tower Hotel
  - West Central Historic District
  - West Eighth Street Historic District

== Education ==
The majority of the municipality is in the Anderson Community School Corporation, which includes one high school, Anderson High School which serves grades 9 – 12; one junior high school, Highland Middle School (formerly Highland High School) which serves grades 6 – 8, six elementary schools (Eastside, Edgewood, Valley Grove, 10th Street, Erskine, Anderson Elementary) which serve k -5, a kindergarten center (Killbuck), and a preschool (Southview). Until 1997, Anderson had three high schools: Highland, Madison Heights and Anderson. In 1997 Madison Heights was closed and Anderson High School moved into that facility. Beginning in the fall of 2010, Highland High School closed and was converted into a junior high school, consolidating all students in grades 9-12 into Anderson High School.

Small portions of the city limits are in the South Madison Community School Corporation.

Anderson also has a charter school (non-traditional, tuition-free public school) called Anderson Preparatory Academy. Currently, Anderson Preparatory Academy features grades K-12. Anderson Preparatory Academy is a college preparatory, military-based academy. All cadets in grades 6-8 are members of the Civil Air Patrol. High school cadets are all members of the Air Force JROTC program. Original plans called to only offer grades 6–9, then add on another upper grade each year before extending the lower years.

Anderson University is within the city, as are a campus of the Ivy Tech Community College of Indiana and a campus of the Purdue Polytechnic Institute.

The city has a lending library, the Anderson Public Library.

== Infrastructure ==
Highways include:

- I-69 / SR 67
- SR 9 / SR 232 / SR 32 / SR 236
- SR 109

== Notable people ==
- Harold Achor, justice of the Indiana Supreme Court
- Jermaine Allensworth, professional baseball outfielder
- Silas Allred, collegiate wrestler
- Lowell Amos, convicted "Black Widower" murderer
- Melvin E. Biddle, World War II Medal of Honor recipient
- Don Brandon, Hall of Fame baseball coach from Anderson University
- Jann Browne, country music singer
- Gary Burton, jazz vibraphonist
- Bob Carey, Indy car driver
- Everett Case, nicknamed "Gray Fox", basketball coach notable for tenure at North Carolina State University, 1946–1964
- Joshua Crockett, sixth president of Bob Jones University
- Buck Crouse, MLB catcher
- James Davis, politician, U.S. Secretary of Labor
- Winfield T. Durbin, politician, former governor of Indiana
- Cory Edwards, producer of Hoodwinked!; created internet series Krogzilla on Smosh's Shut Up Cartoons channel
- Carl Erskine, Professional baseball player, BKN/LA Dodgers Pitcher from 1948 to 1959.
- Gordon Gordon, crime novelist
- Krystal Harris, singer
- Charles L. Henry, politician, congressman, coiner of term "interurban"
- William Leo Higi, bishop of the Diocese of Lafayette in Indiana
- Orville Hodge, embezzler
- Gary Hoover, businessman, author, entrepreneur
- Robert Kessler, 1st Team All-American and 2x First-team Big Ten basketball player for Purdue University from 1933 to 1936
- James Kilgore, Symbionese Liberation Army member
- John William Lambert, inventor of first successful U.S. gasoline automobile
- Adam Lind, MLB player for Washington Nationals, Seattle Mariners
- Matt Lutz, actor
- Von Mansfield, NFL defensive back
- Brittany Mason, model
- Mack Mattingly, politician, Georgia senator
- Gary McGhee, professional basketball player
- Jon McLaughlin, singer
- Phyllis Reynolds Naylor, author
- Phill Niblock, composer and filmmaker
- Bruce Nickells, harness racing driver and trainer
- Sandi Patty, singer
- Amber Portwood, TV personality
- James Rebhorn, actor
- Kris Roe (The Ataris), singer
- Donald Starr, journalist and war correspondent for the Chicago Tribune
- Kevin Stein, poet laureate of Illinois
- Fred Mustard Stewart, author
- Max Terhune, actor
- Ray Tolbert, basketball player for Indiana's 1981 NCAA championship team
- Greg Van Alst, NASCAR driver
- Albert Henry Vestal, majority whip of House of Representatives, 1923–1931
- Len Walston, singer-songwriter and music producer
- Louis J. Weichmann, witness for the prosecution in the trial of the alleged conspirators involved in the assassination of Abraham Lincoln
- Bob Wilkerson, basketball player for Indiana's undefeated 1976 NCAA championship team
- Jumping Johnny Wilson, basketball and baseball player
