= West Central Historic District (Anderson, Indiana) =

Historic district in Indiana, United States

- U.S. National Register of Historic Places
- U.S. Historic district
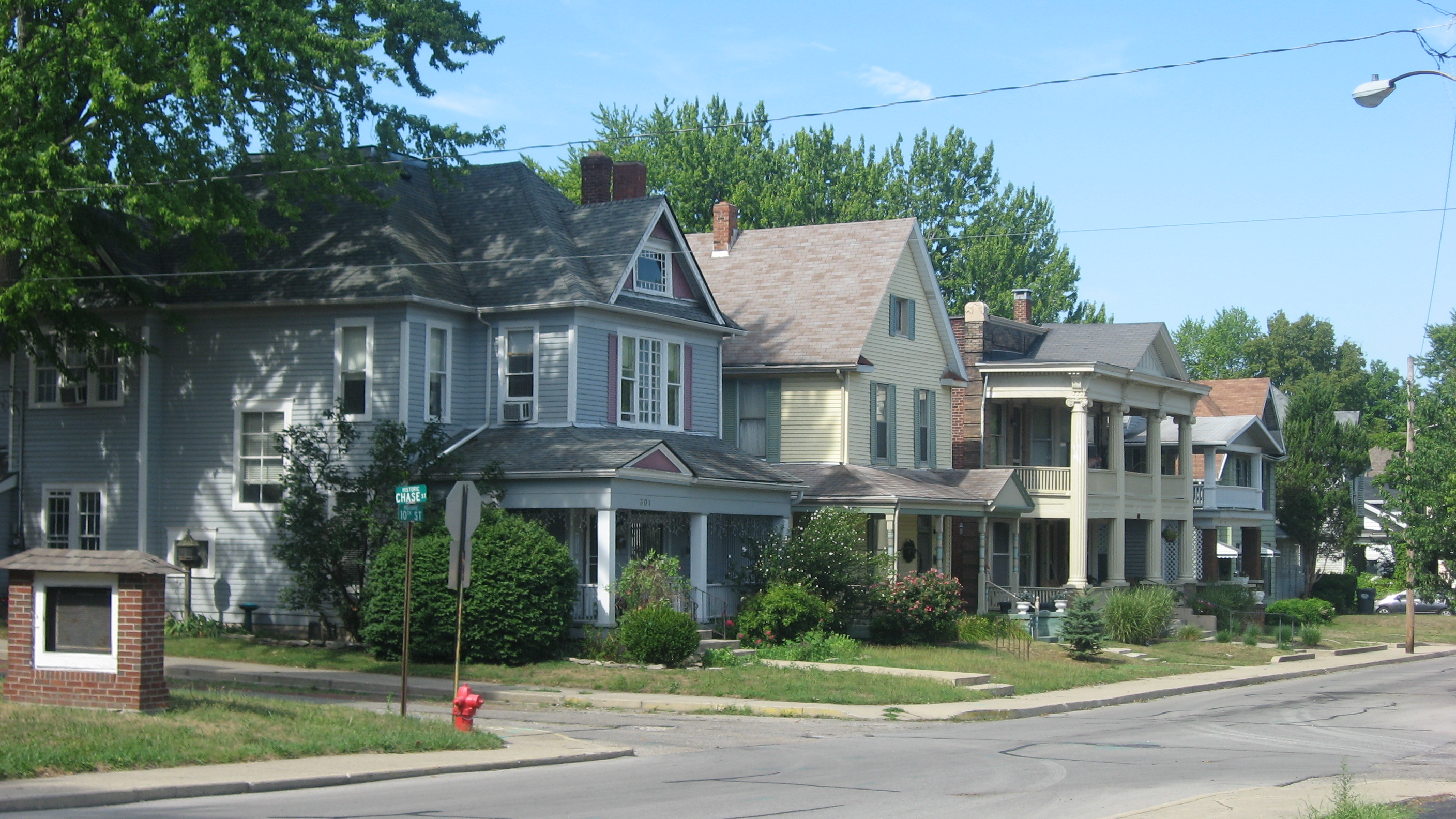
- Houses on Tenth Street in the district

- Location within Indiana Location within the United States
- Location: Roughly bounded by Brown-Delaware, 10th, John, and 13th Sts., Anderson, Indiana
- Coordinates: 40°6′17″N 85°41′43″W
- Area: 30 acres (12 ha)
- Architectural style: Italianate, Bungalow, Dutch Colonial, American Foursquare, Shingle
- NRHP reference No.: 84000515
- Added to NRHP: December 6, 1984

West Central Historic District is a national historic district located at Anderson, Indiana. Structures were constructed from the late 19th century to well into the first half of the 20th century. This long span of history was responsible for the great variety of styles found throughout the District. There are approximately 200 structures within this District which represent Italianate, Bungalow, Dutch Colonial, American Foursquare, and Shingle Styles.

It was listed in the National Register of Historic Places in 1984.
