= Patrick Anderson of Walston =

17th-century minister and covenanter

Patrick Anderson

Personal life
- Education: University of St Andrews

Religious life
- Religion: Christianity
- School: Presbyterianism
- Profession: minister

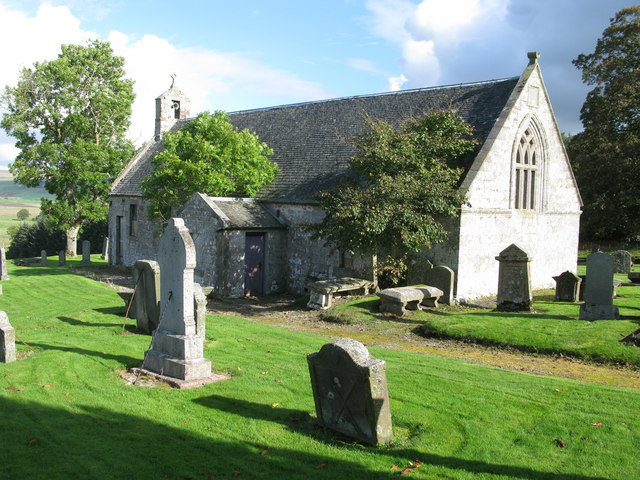
Former Walston Parish Church

Patrick Anderson of Walston was a 17th-century minister and Covenanter.

== Early life ==
He graduated with an M.A. from St. Andrews 1648. He came to Walston between 1 May and 1 November 1655.

== Legal troubles ==
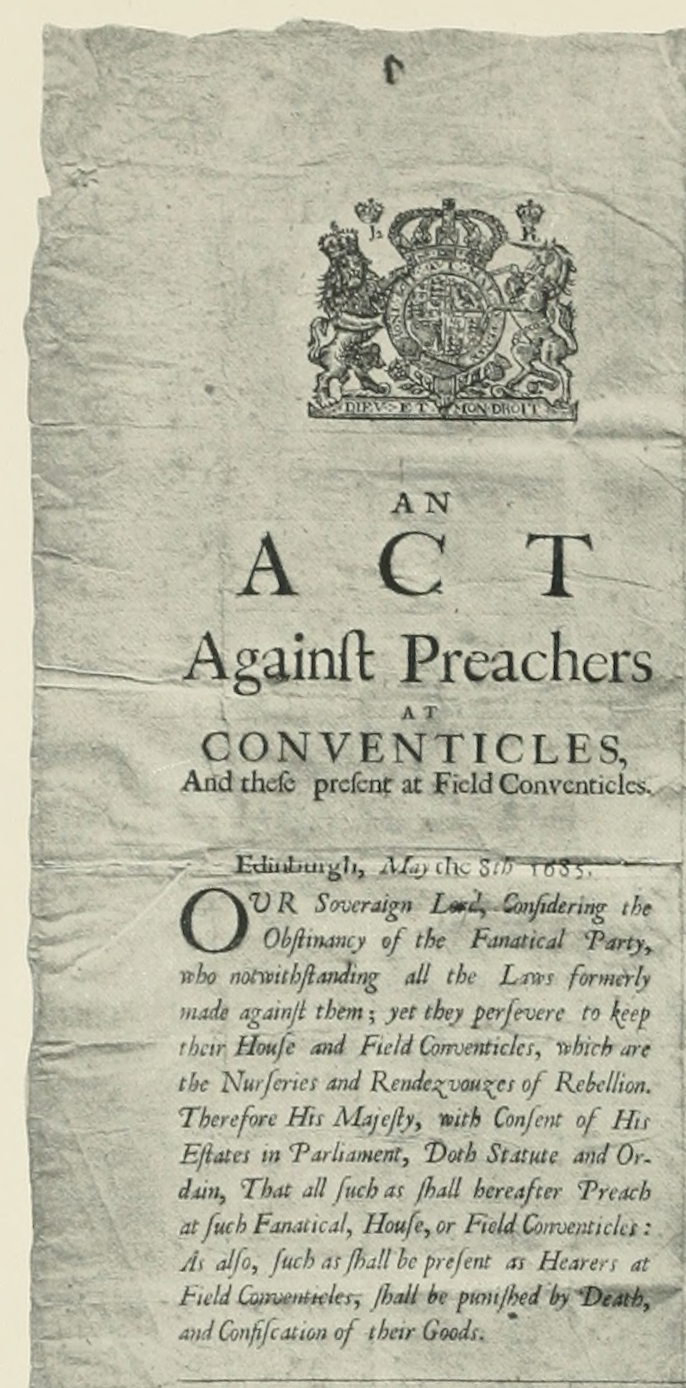
The Scottish Parliament on 8 May 1685, have recorded the following : Our sovereign Lord, considering the obstinacy of the fanatical party who, notwithstanding all the laws formerly made against them, still keep their house and field conventicles, which are the nurseries and rendezvouses of rebellion; therefore His Majesty, with consent of Parliament, ordains that all such persons who shall hereafter preach at such house or field conventicles, also those who shall be present as hearers, shall be punished by death and confiscation of their goods.

He was subsequently deprived of his post by Act of Parliament 11 June, and of Privy Council 1 October 1662. He was granted indulgence in Dreghorn or at Kilbirnie prior to 22 October 1674.

He was ejected for non-conformity in 1663. In September 1672, he was ordered by the council, under the Act of Indulgence, to repair to the parish of Kilbirnie, and there to remain confined, with permission to preach and to exercise the other parts of his ministerial function, - which order he did not obey. In 1673, he was called before the council, and ordered to his confinement. He stayed in Edinburgh at Potterrow for some years but was called before the Privy Council, on 3 April 1678, on a charge of having held conventicles at Boghall, Biggar, and in his house during the years 1674–8, and of corresponding with John Welsh, Gabriel Semple, and other intercommuned persons such as Williamson and Johnston. He appeared and denied the charge. He was pronounced guilty and sentenced to imprisonment on the Bass, unless he found caution to the amount of 2000 merks, and agreed to remove from Edinburgh and not come within five and a half miles of the city, or converse with any persons but the members of his own family. He was sent to the Bass Rock on the Firth of Forth in Haddingtonshire in April 1678. He found the necessary security, and retired to Dalkeith, where he set up a meeting-house. He was released in July 1679. At the request of the Duchess of Buccleuch and Monmouth he was forbidden, and threatened with imprisonment. He returned to Walston before 6 July 1689. Anderson survived the Revolution, and on the ejection of Mr. John Kinked, an Episcopalian incumbent, he became minister of his old parish of Walston, where he laboured with great acceptance until he died. He was restored in 1689. He returned previous to 6 July 1689. He was restored by Act of Parliament 25 April 1690, and died 22 July following, aged about 63.

== Family ==
He married Margaret Threipland, who was joined with him in a sasine, 29 November 1659, and in another with their children, 24 June 1663, of the corn mill of Biggar and pertinents. His son James, M.A., W.S., Postmaster-General for Scotland, genealogist and antiquary, author of Selectus Diplomatum Numismatum Scotice Thesaurus, and of Collections relating to the History of Mary, Queen of Scots, born 5 August 1662, died 3 April 1728.

His daughter Mary married (cont. 23rd, 25th, and 29 April 1678: Perth Sas., vii., 193) David Pitcairn of Dreghorn, and was grandmother of Principal Robertson.

His son James Anderson was a Writer to the Signet and was appointed Postmaster General for Scotland and became a well-known Scottish antiquary and historian.

Uncle of Rev David Anderson, who was admitted in 1679 to the Ministry of the Parish on Dunbarney, and afterwards of Perth, Prof. of Humanity in St. Leonard's College. After the Revolution of 1689, and on the re-establishment of Presbyterian Church Govt., he refused to violate his conscience by conforming, and was deprived of his charge, educated St. Andrews.

== Bibliography ==
- Kirkton's and Wodrow's Histories
- New Statistical Account of Scotland, Vol vi
- New Gen. Reg. Sasines, iii., iv.
- Inq. Ret. Gen., 7188
- Murray's Biog. Ann.
- Chalmers's Life of Ruddiman
- Chambers's Biographical Dictionary., i.
- The moderators of the Church of Scotland from 1690 to 1740
- Burkes Landed Gentry. Anderson of Northfield, formerly of St. Germains and Bourhouse.
