= Fall Creek Meeting House =

Historic meetinghouse in Indiana, United States

- U.S. National Register of Historic Places
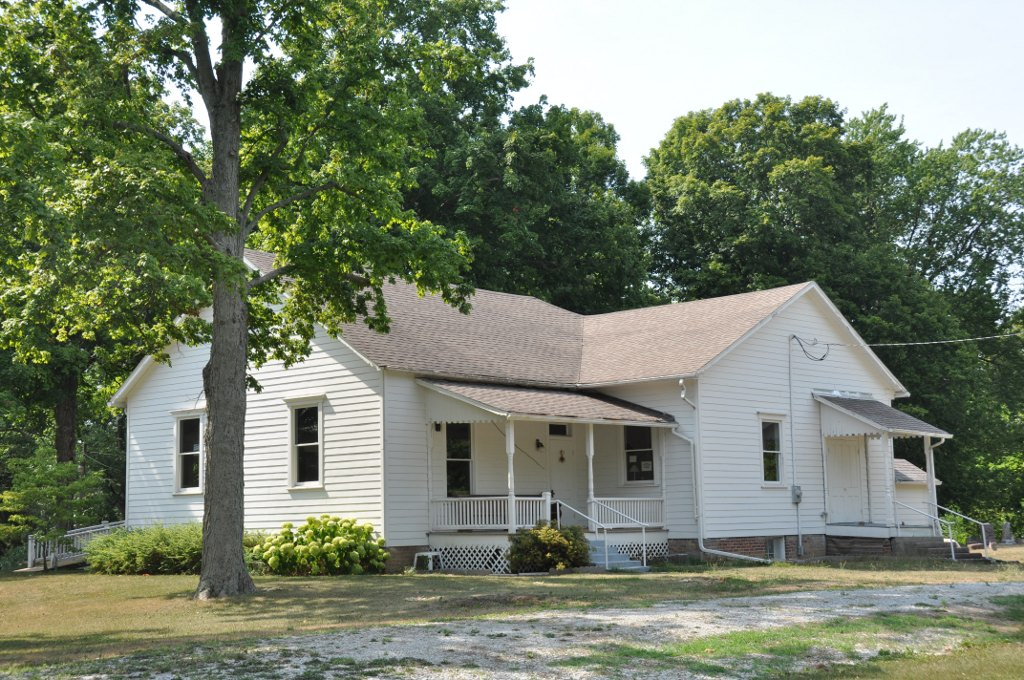

- Location within Indiana Location within the United States
- Nearest city: State Road 38 southeast of Pendleton, approximately 1.5 miles southeast of its junction with U.S. Route 36, Fall Creek Township, Madison County, Indiana
- Coordinates: 39°59′35″N 85°42′23″W
- Area: 1.8 acres (0.73 ha)
- Built: 1857
- NRHP reference No.: 96001544
- Added to NRHP: January 2, 1997

The Fall Creek Meeting House is a historic Quaker meeting house located approximately 3 miles (4.8 km) east of Pendleton, Indiana, United States, on State Road 38 in Fall Creek Township, Madison County, Indiana.

== History ==
In 1834, Enos Adamson deeded 3 acres (12,000 m^{2}) east of Pendleton to the Society of Friends. Adamson was paid $15 for the land. In 1836 the congregation built a log house for worship on the ground. In 1857, a frame meeting house was constructed at a cost of $800. The meeting house is representative of the rural meeting houses of the period. The building is still maintained and a pioneer cemetery adjoins the meeting house.

It was listed in the National Register of Historic Places in 1997.
