= The Last Mile (prison rehabilitation program) =

American nonprofit organization

Turn 2 U Inc. dba The Last Mile (TLM) is an Oakland, CA based 501(c)(3) nonprofit organization whose mission is to provide opportunities for personal and professional growth for justice-impacted individuals through education and technology training.

The Last Mile originated with its first program in San Quentin State Prison with the California Department of Corrections and Rehabilitation. TLM has leveraged the power of public-private partnerships with Department of corrections and industry-leading companies to build and expand its programs.

Programs are currently operating in 16 facilities across 7 states in the United States, including California, Indiana, Oklahoma, Michigan, North Dakota, Montana and Massachusetts. TLM has been able to expand its purpose, "To Imagine, Build, and Open Doors," into other facilities through these partnerships as well as funding and employment opportunities from the technology sector.

== History ==
After visiting a business class at San Quentin State Prison, Chris Redlitz and Beverly Parenti created The Last Mile. The program was founded to address the high rates of unemployment amongst the formerly incarcerated population after they are released, by empowering justice-impacted people with the skills needed to succeed in today's job market.Students cultivate personal and professional development in alignment with the technical education and with the support of TLM reentry staff, volunteers, and a community founded on shared lived experience.In-classroom curricula and course material prepare students for meaningful employment in modern job roles including web development, software engineering, and audio and video production.

Entrepreneurship

The Last Mile was initially modeled as a pro bono startup accelerator inside San Quentin, designed with prison security protocols and restrictions in mind. With mentorship from Redlitz and Parenti, each participant conceptualized a business, developed a business plan, and prepared a business pitch. In May 2012, the inaugural TLM Demo Day was held at San Quentin State Prison with six graduates pitching their startup ideas in front of 350+ business and tech C-suite executives, entrepreneurs, government officials, and new organization.

Web Development

In 2014, The Last Mile launched its coding program, the first fully inclusive computer programming curriculum available in a US prison, in partnership with the California Prison Industry Authority. TLM’s Web Development Program (also known in California as the Code.7370 Coding Program) was implemented at San Quentin State Prison as a career training program with the goal of teaching students to become software engineers, improving their opportunities for gainful employment when they returned home. The program has since expanded to 7 states and 16 facilities, serving justice-impacted populations in men's, women's and youth facilities.

AVP

The Last Mile launched its first classroom of the Audio and Video Production Program (AVP) in Indiana at Putnamville Correctional Facility September 13, 2021.

The AVP Program was designed in-house by audio program specialists, who used video content and practice files donated by LinkedIn Learning as a basis for instruction. The program's coursework from LinkedIn Learning focuses on the fundamentals of sound and audio engineering, with the intention that students gain software proficiency to become audio engineers or producers. SiriusXM partnered with TLM to help develop the curriculum and provide sound engineering content. Avid Technology also sponsored TLM to participate in the Avid Learning Collective, which provides the program with curricular content, audio and video creation software and certifications. This formative collaboration works in service of students to build the necessary skills to enter the field of audio engineering as apprentices or interns post-release. The AVP program expanded to San Quentin State Prison on April 18, 2022, making it the second classroom at TLM to teach Audio and Video Production.

== Expansion ==
After launching at San Quentin State Prison, The Last Mile continued expanding among California’s correctional facilities for men, women, and youth throughout California. In 2018, The Last Mile launched its Web Development Program in Indiana facilities and has since continued to expand to other states, as outlined in the table below. The Last Mile focuses on implementing its programs at the state level with a combination of public and private funding.

Locations

Current Facilities	State	Year Launched	Year Closes	Serving
San Quentin State Prison	CA	2010	-	Men
Ironwood State Prison	CA	2015	-	Men
Folsom Women's Facility	CA	2017	2023	Women
Pelican Bay State Prison	CA	2018	-	Men
Ventura Youth Correctional Facility	CA	2018	2023	Young Adult
California Institute For Women	CA	2018	-	Women
Indiana Women’s Prison	IN	2018	-	Women
Pendleton Correctional Facility	IN	2018	2021	Young Adult
O.H. Close Youth Correctional Facility	CA	2019	2022	Young Adult
Topeka Correctional Facility	KS	2019	2021	Women
Mabel Bassett Correctional Center	OK	2019	-	Women
Putnamville Correctional Facility	IN	2019	-	Men
Rockville Correctional Facility	IN	2019	-	Women
Plainfield Correctional Facility	IN	2019	-	Men
Parnall Correctional Facility	MI	2019	-	Men
North Dakota State Penitenentiary	ND	2020	-	Men
Montana State Prison	MT	2022	-	Men
Massachusetts Correction Facility- Shirley	MA	2022	-	Men

== Programs ==
TLM utilizes a custom-built remote instruction software and Learning Management System (LMS) to deliver educational programming into correctional facilities across the country. The organization’s staff creates and delivers course content with coordination support from classroom facilitators, who oversee students’ daily activity in person.

=== Structure ===
==== Platform as a service ====
- TLM's Engineering Department has developed an entire platform as a service (PaaS), including machine/user management, a secure network stack, and home-grown applications and curricular tooling, which are all designed to deliver a consistent and state-of-the-art student experience at scale.
- Our cloud-based infrastructure supports a robust and ever-growing software suite, which provides students with industry-best-in-class tools such as VS Code, GitLab, MongoDB, DevDocs, and more. All stack deployments and identity management are centrally controlled, giving TLM the flexibility to custom-build and deploy new tools and software all within the same secure environment. Our curriculum is developed in-house and released biannually.

List of platforms available to PPs

- Canvas LMS: Learning management system.
- CND Service: Simulated Content Delivery Network (CDN), providing content for various frontend libraries and resources.
- DevDocs (Mirror): Offline documentation browser.
- GitLab: Open source code repository platform.
- Lightbox: Image repository for student projects.
- Messaging: Classroom-Chat platform.
- Palette Color Picker: Color scheme generator.
- Regex Test Tool: A tool to learn, build, and test Regular Expression
- Rest Endpoint: Simulated REST API endpoint.
- Stack Overflow (Mirror): Offline browser of Stack Overflow
- SQRank: JavaScript challenges of varying difficulty.
- Storage: Cloud-based secured storage for students.
- Support: Centralized remote support platform for students.
- Surveys: Centralized survey platform used to measure student feedback.
- Typing Trainer: Offline Touch Typing Trainer
- Wikipedia (Mirror): Encyclopedia platform.

== Curriculum ==
=== In-Prison Education ===
- Web Development Program: a 12 month coding program in which students learn full stack software engineering using a platform that simulates the internet. The course curriculum includes web development fundamentals such as HTML, CSS, JavaScript, jQuery, and Bootstrap as well as MERN, a software stack that four open-source technologies: MongoDB, Express.js, React, and Node.js.
- AVP: TLM’s Audio and Video Production (AVP) Program currently consists of one 6 month course that provides an overview of several audio production careers and covers the fundamentals of sound and hearing, recording equipment, and signal flow. After several weeks of training on the use of the three main types of signal processors, students put their skills and knowledge to the test in the creation of six full-scale music mixing and spoken word production. Students use Avid Pro Tools, the industry-standard software for editing and mixing digital audio.
- Remote Instruction: The goal of Remote Instruction (RI) is to provide an interpersonal connection between students and TLM, and to apply real-world examples to what students are learning. Remote Instructors host weekly live sessions on technical concepts that are introduced through the learning management system, supplementing the curriculum by providing tangible applications for abstract concepts and with in-the-moment examples and exercises.
- Self-directed learning: Students engage with required readings, video tutorials, activities, and project-based assignments via TLM's learning management system. Course content is grouped into weekly modules and thematic units, and is updated on a biannual bases to ensure alignment with recent trends in relevant professional sectors.
- Academic Support: The goal of Academic Support (AS) is to strengthen the students' understanding of the content in each course by connecting what they are learning to real-world examples and resources. The Academic Support team supports students' learning by providing them with reliable and consistent point of contact for technical requests, providing additional resources, answering any questions they may have regarding the curriculum, giving them individualized feedback, and grading all major projects for students across all the classroom.

=== Reentry ===
The Reentry Department offers a full LMS course, Reentry and Professional Development (RPD), that equips students with the tools they need to apply their education in the workforce. In this course students submit transition plans and communicate with the Reentry Department about their plans and priorities for reentry. Returned Citizen Advocates support individuals based on personalized plans to prepare them for a successful transition leading up to the release date. To encourage reentry planning and increase student engagement, the Reentry Department launched a course for current students, Reentry & Professional Development, which is delivered in our LMS. This comprehensive course is composed of a series of modules designed to equip returned citizens with the skills necessary to secure employment upon release, whether it be an internship, an apprenticeship, or freelance. RPD includes the following professional development categories:

- Grow With Google Digital Literacy Skills
- Electronic Correspondence Etiquette
- Online Hygiene
- Navigating a Professional Workspace
- Finding a Job and Networking
- Writing a Resume and Cover Letter
- Project Management
- Interview Preparation
- Building a Personal Brand
- Freelance Best Practices
- Preparing for Reentry (building credit, IRS, free books, transitional housing, government resources, transitional planning, and goal setting)

In addition to the static resources included in RPD, students are able to interact with the Reentry Department while still enrolled in the program. Through our Help Desk platform, students are able to submit transition plans to the Reentry team prior to their release and receive feedback, as well as suggestions for resources that may help address some of the challenges that they anticipate may arise when coming home. TLM’s Reentry Department has continued their work towards securing more partnerships with community-based organizations, including those that provide housing, healthcare, and continuing education services.

The Last Mile’s Reentry Department supports the successful reintegration of released citizens back into society, the workforce, and their families. This is accomplished by providing business and technology resources, as well as employment opportunities through their network of fair chance employers and referrals to community resources. They have supported the idea that lives are transformed through education, opportunity, and meaningful employment. Their asserted goal is to create pathways for every TLM returning citizen to maximize their success.

TLM understands that the successful reentry of returning citizens requires a holistic approach. Our participants have the technical skills to launch a fulfilling career. We provide workshops pre- and post-release to ensure returned citizens have the tools and resources to help them overcome the challenges that lie ahead. This includes career development such as resume writing, interview prep and soft skill building. Additionally, TLM’s reentry department assists in job placement support and alumni community building so that the network of alumni can share and discuss common obstacles and goals in the reentry process, particularly relating to career development.

- Career development: Support in areas such as resume writing, interview prep, and soft skill building.
- Job placement support: Connections to apprenticeship and employment opportunities, as well as job search assistance.
- Alumni community: Access to TLM’s network of alumni who share and discuss common obstacles and goals in the reentry process, particularly relating to career development.

== In-Prison Laptop Program ==
The Chromebook Pilot Program launched in 2021 in partnership with California Department of Corrections and Rehabilitation (CDCR) and the California Prison Industry Authority (CALPIA). The innovative pilot allows students to use laptops in their housing units. The program is the first of its kind in the United States, providing students with mobile technology that they carry daily between their disconnected housing units and the TLM classroom to continue working and studying during non-classroom hours. Full time laptop usage allows students to continue to interact with course material, despite lockdowns or weekends when classroom access is unavailable. This allows them to stay on course with the curriculum, despite any unforeseen circumstances. By allowing additional time via the laptops, the opportunity provides experience that is comparable to external boot camps outside of the carceral system.

Since its inception in 2021, The Last Mile has expanded the Chromebook Program to 4 states and 8 facilities, with plans to distribute laptops in all of TLM's classrooms by the end of 2024.

== Impact ==
TLM graduates have an 85% employment rate within 6 months of release. 75% of TLM graduates continue their education after release. TLM has currently served over 1,200 students through web development and AVP.

Fair-Chance Hiring

The Last Mile is regarded by advocates of both prison reform and workplace diversity, as the program's results have proven to reduce recidivism and mobilize nontraditional career pathways. After decades of incarceration, alumni have been hired by Slack, GoodRx, Zoom, Dropbox, Adobe, the Chan Zuckerberg Initiative (CZI), VMware, Fandom, and Checkr, among other companies, after becoming qualified full stack developers through TLM's in-prison program.

== The Last Mile Radio ==
The Last Mile Radio, a collaboration with SiriusXM and The Last Mile, inspires listeners with motivational stories from justice-involved people who have experienced personal transformation, and amplifies the voices of leaders in business, government, entertainment, education, and sports who are agents of change in the U.S. justice system. The show chronicles successful prison education programs, including The Last Mile’s Audio and Video Production Program. Audiences journey into a world that is often closed off from society.

The show is hosted by The Last Mile co-founder Chris Redlitz and Eric Abercrombie aka Maserati-e, a talented musician and skilled audio engineer, who was incarcerated at 17 years old and served 9 years in prison. The show features inspirational stories from justice involved people who have achieved success after their incarceration, from change agents in business, sports, entertainment and politics. Some of the most recent guests include the iconic artist 50 Cent, Indiana Governor Eric Holcomb, Grammy winning producer Allen Hughes, Quincy Delight Jones III (QD3), the legendary manager Leila Steinberg. Grammy nominated artist Aloe Blacc, and best selling author Shaka Senghor.

The show is broadcast on Saturday’s on SiriusXM and on thelastmileradio.org

== Media coverage ==
The program has been covered in Reuters, The Atlantic, BBC News, ReadWriteWeb, TechCrunch, and other newspapers and magazines.

The program was also discussed by Neil Cavuto in his TV show for the Fox Business Network.

Co-founder Chris Redlitz spoke on The Last Mile in Axios.
