= Huntsville, Indiana =

Huntville, Indiana may refer to:

- Huntsville, Madison County, Indiana, an unincorporated community in Fall Creek Township, nearly surrounded by Pendleton, Indiana.
- Huntsville, Randolph County, Indiana, an unincorporated community in Union Township.
