= Howard Allen =

American serial killer

- Allen in 1994
- Born: Howard Arthur Allen; February 10, 1949; Indianapolis, Indiana, U.S.
- Died: June 5, 2020 (aged 71); Wabash Valley Correctional Facility, Haddon Township, Indiana, U.S.
- Status: Deceased
- Convictions: Murder; Voluntary manslaughter Robbery with serious bodily injury Theft
- Penalty: Death; commuted to 98 years imprisonment

Details
- Victims: 3
- Span of crimes: 1974–1987
- Country: United States
- State: Indiana
- Date apprehended: August 4, 1987

Howard Arthur Allen (February 10, 1949 – June 5, 2020) was an American serial killer from Indianapolis, Indiana. He murdered three elderly people and also committed assault, burglary, and arson.

== Early life ==
Allen was one of eight children who were raised by an impoverished single mother. He sometimes stole food for the family. Allen was enrolled in special education classes for mentally disabled children, and was still reading at a second grade level when he left elementary school. A special education director said Allen "had difficulty processing language" as a child, that his "thinking and decision-making would be very concrete," and that he "could have difficulty understanding the consequences of his conduct and could be easily led."

There were disputes over whether Allen was mentally disabled, since he scored 104 on an IQ test and his mother called him an "average" student. None of Allen's family members described him as anything other than of normal intelligence, nor did any of eighteen people who submitted letters on his behalf before sentencing.

== Crimes ==
In August 1974, Allen beat 85-year-old Opal Cooper to death during a burglary. He was sentenced to 21 years in prison for voluntary manslaughter, winning parole in 1985.

On May 18, 1987, Laverne Hale, 87, was attacked in her Indianapolis home by Allen and beaten to death. On July 14, 1987, he murdered 74-year-old Ernestine Griffin in her Indianapolis home. After the police found a piece of paper with Allen's name and phone number on her counter, a neighbor told them that Allen had talked with Griffin about a car that the neighbor had for sale. After the police discovered Griffin's camera at the carwash where Allen worked, he was taken in for questioning. Allen admitted that he had struck Griffin, but denied killing her.

On June 11, 1988, Allen was sentenced to death for the murder of Griffin. He received a concurrent 50-year sentence for robbery with serious bodily injury, and a consecutive 38-year sentence for theft. On August 30, 1988, he was placed on death row where he spent the next 25 years awaiting a ruling by a U.S. district court on a petition for a writ of habeas corpus. After years of unsuccessful attempts to prove that he was intellectually disabled and thus ineligible for execution, a federal court agreed and overturned his death sentence. Allen was resentenced to 60 years in prison for the murder in 2012. The Indiana Department of Correction had listed his release date as April 23, 2035. Allen was imprisoned at the Wabash Valley Correctional Facility.

Allen died on June 5, 2020, at the age of 71. His death was confirmed by the Indiana Department of Correction.

== See also ==
- List of serial killers in the United States
