= Lisanne =

Lisanne is a feminine given name. Notable people with the name include:

- Lisanne Bainbridge, author of the 1983 research paper Ironies of Automation
- Lisanne Falk (born 1964), American actress and film producer
- Lisanne Froon (1991–2014), one of two Dutch students who died while hiking in Panama
- Lisanne de Lange (born 1994), field hockey player from the Netherlands
- Lisanne Lejeune (born 1963), former Dutch field hockey defender
- Lisanne Norman (born 1951), British science fiction author
- Lisanne de Roever (born 1979), Dutch field hockey player
- Lisanne Soemanta (born 1987), Dutch professional racing cyclist
- Lisanne de Witte (born 1992), Dutch sprinter
- Lisanne Van Der Lelij (born 1996), Dutch rower

== Other ==
- Lisanne Gardner, a character from the American daytime soap opera Days of Our Lives

== See also ==
- Lišane Ostrovičke, a village and a municipality in Croatia in the Zadar County
