= Abigail Williams (disambiguation) =

Abigail Williams (born c. 1681) was one of the initial accusers in the Salem witch trials.

Abigail Williams may also refer to:

- Abigail Williams (band), an American black metal band
- Abigail Williams, 2014 recipient of a University of Oxford title of distinction
- Abigail Williams, victim of the murders of Abigail Williams and Liberty German in 2017
- Abigail Williams, an As the World Turns character
- Abigail Williams, a Fate/Grand Order character
