= Young Kids, Hard Time =

Young Kids, Hard Time is an American MSNBC TV show which premiered November 20, 2011. The show is about children age 12 to 17 incarcerated as adults in the American prison system. These children have all been tried as an adult. The United States is among only a few countries in the world where children can be tried as adults. The show was shot at the Pendleton Juvenile Correctional Facility and the YIA (Youth Incarcerated As Adults) unit of the Wabash Valley Correctional Facility in Indiana. The crimes portrayed range from theft to parricide. The series was produced by Calamari Productions.
