= Heritage Trail Correctional Facility =

Prison in Plainfield, Indiana, US

Coordinates: 39°41′19″N 86°24′56″W

- Interactive map of Heritage Trail Correctional Facility
- Location: 501 W. Main Street Plainfield, Indiana
- Status: open
- Security class: minimum
- Capacity: 827
- Opened: 2014
- Managed by: GEO Group

The Heritage Trail Correctional Facility is a private minimum-security state prison for men located in Plainfield, Hendricks County, Indiana, United States, operated by the GEO Group under contract with the Indiana Department of Correction.

Heritage Trail is operated at minimum security and focuses on inmates transitioning out of the system. Heritage Trail first opened in 2014 following the closure of the Indiana Boys School. The facility had an average capacity of 827 inmates through 2014. The facility stands on the site of the former state reformatory, the Indiana House of Refuge, first established in 1867.
