= Fall Creek Township, Madison County, Indiana =

Fall Creek Township
- Township
- Location in Madison County
- Coordinates: 39°59′53″N 85°43′49″W
- Country: United States
- State: Indiana
- County: Madison

Government
  - Type: Indiana township

Area
  - Total: 42.27 sq mi (109.5 km^{2})
  - Land: 41.98 sq mi (108.7 km^{2})
  - Water: 0.29 sq mi (0.75 km^{2}) 0.69%
- Elevation: 879 ft (268 m)

Population (2020)
  - Total: 14,949
  - Density: 350.1/sq mi (135.2/km^{2})
- ZIP codes: 46011, 46013, 46040, 46048, 46064
- GNIS feature ID: 0453292

Fall Creek Township is one of fourteen townships in Madison County, Indiana, United States. As of the 2010 census, its population was 14,695 and it contained 4,570 housing units.

It was named from its principal stream and waterfalls.

== History ==
The Fall Creek Meeting House was listed in the National Register of Historic Places in 1997.

== Geography ==
According to the 2010 census, the township has a total area of 42.27 square miles (109.5 km^{2}), of which 41.98 square miles (108.7 km^{2}) (or 99.31%) is land and 0.29 square miles (0.75 km^{2}) (or 0.69%) is water.

=== Cities, towns, villages ===
- Anderson (southwest edge)
- Pendleton (vast majority)

=== Unincorporated towns ===
- Huntsville at 40.008653°N 85.730255°W
- Idlewold at 39.986153°N 85.752755°W

(This list is based on USGS data and may include former settlements.)

=== Cemeteries ===
The township contains these four cemeteries: Anderson Memorial Park, Bunker, Crosley and Grovelawn.

=== Major highways ===
- Interstate 69
- U.S. Route 36
- State Road 9
- State Road 38
- State Road 67

=== Airports and landing strips ===
- Harless Airport
- Huntzinger Airport

== Prisons ==
Three facilities of the Indiana Department of Corrections are in Fall Creek Township

- Pendleton Correctional Facility
- Correctional Industrial Facility
- Pendleton Juvenile Correctional Facility

== Education ==
- South Madison Community School Corporation

Fall Creek Township residents may obtain a free library card from the Pendleton Community Public Library in Pendleton.

== Political districts ==
- Indiana's 6th congressional district
- State House District 37
- State Senate District 25
