= Pendleton Juvenile Correctional Facility =

Prison in Indiana, United States

Coordinates: 39°58′09″N 85°46′29″W

- Interactive map of Pendleton Juvenile Correctional Facility
- Status: Operational
- Security class: Maximum
- Capacity: 391
- Opened: July 5, 2000
- Managed by: Indiana Department of Corrections Division of Youth
- Website: Official website

The Pendleton Juvenile Correctional Facility is a maximum-security Indiana Department of Corrections prison for juvenile males between the ages of 12 and one minute before they turn 22. The facility is located in Fall Creek Township, Madison County, southwest of Pendleton. The campus-style facility has an average daily population of 245 males. The Pendleton Facility was established in 2000 with the purpose of "preparing young men for re-entry into society with the necessary skills to avoid further criminal behavior."

== History ==
The Pendleton Juvenile Correctional Facility was opened in July 2000. For 133 years, the Indiana Boys School, located in Plainfield, Indiana, had served as the primary facility for juvenile males in the state. Due to the increase in male juveniles being sentenced to prison, and consequent overcrowding at the Boys School, the Indiana Department of Corrections built a new facility.

In 2005, the Indiana Boys School was closed. Most of the boys at that facility were transferred to the Indianapolis Juvenile Correctional Facility. However, approximately 100 juvenile sex offenders who had been part of a special sex offender program were sent to the Pendleton Juvenile Facility. In addition, last year, a gang-intervention unit for gang leaders and participants was created at Pendleton.

== Institutional population ==
The Pendleton Juvenile institution has 360 beds. Though the population has dipped as low as 150, more often it has been at full capacity. As of December 1, 2007, the population was 245 boys. They constitute 27 percent of the 1,150 Juvenile males incarcerated in Indiana.

In 2006, approximately 57 percent of the inmates were white, 35 percent black, and 5 percent Hispanic. The staff was 61 percent white, 34 percent black, and 1 percent Hispanic. Half of the staff was equally divided between males and females.

== Physical layout ==
The campus-style facility contains individual one-story buildings surrounded by fencing and barbed-wire. Inside the fence, there are four main housing complexes: A, C, D, E. Housing Complex A is made up of two units of 24 beds, while C, D, E are each made up of 4 units of 24 beds. Also inside the fence are the Program, Administrative and Service Buildings. The Program Building contains classrooms, school offices, a recreation area, custody offices, religious and volunteer offices, and a chapel. Located next to the Programs Building is the Administration Building that holds business and administrative offices, a training area, and a visiting room. The Services Building contains two offender dining halls, a staff dining room, kitchen, laundry, Acute Care Unit/Nursing-Medical Unit, medical offices, and 2 segregation units of 24 beds. Outside the fence are warehouses and maintenance buildings with offices and trade shops.

=== Units ===
- A-1 is for the special needs kids.
- A-2 is for the new intakes.
- B-3 is the segregation unit which houses short-term and long-term (Behavioral Modification Unit)
- B-4 is currently closed pending transition into high risk offenders.
- C Complex is strictly for sex offenders until they complete their program, then are released into "general population"
- D Complex is general population.
- E Complex is a specialty complex.

== Programs ==
The Pendleton Juvenile Correctional Facility offers treatment-based programs that attempt to identify an inmate's needs and goals in life. The programs include: STEP, (Sex Offender Treatment and Education), Plus (Purposeful Living Units Serve), and GROW (Gang Realities in Our World). There have been many community service projects since the opening in 2000, such as a Habitat for Humanity project that involved building wall panels in the Building Trades classes and working on-site to help in the construction. Many inmates have chosen to volunteer at Falls Park, Pendleton, cleaning and planting trees. Some have helped take down Pioneer Village at the State Fair. Others have chosen to work in the warehouses at Gleaners and Second Harvest. Other programs include: supporting a paper recycling program on grounds, participating in the Indiana Reading & Information Services 3 times a week, collecting and delivering newspapers to the Madison County Humane Society, and working in the warehouse of Teachers' Treasures.

Indiana University's Helping Offenders Prosper Through Employment (HOPE) program operates at Pendleton Juvenile Correctional Facility. The program pairs incarcerated mentees with undergraduate mentors who support mentees in future goal setting, developing life skills, employment competencies, and successful community reentry.

== Noteworthy incidents ==
In July 2007, a 19-year-old former Pendleton Juvenile Correctional Facility inmate was sentenced to two years in an adult prison for fondling a 13-year-old fellow inmate at the facility the previous year. On August 3, 2007, a 15-year-old inmate was scalded by water in the prison dishwasher after volunteering to work in the kitchen. The teen received second-degree and third-degree burns on his face, hands, arms, and neck. Allegations were made that he was forced into the dishwasher. On August 28, an inmate was stabbed three times in the back while eating in the dining room. The wounds were not life-threatening. A 15-year-old boy was hospitalized with a serious head injury after he was injured during a fight on September 28, 2006.
