= Correctional Industrial Facility =

Prison in Indiana, United States

Coordinates: 39.982398°N 85.759066°W

- Interactive map of Correctional Industrial Facility
- Location: 5124 Reformatory Road Pendleton, Indiana
- Status: open
- Security class: medium
- Capacity: 1416
- Opened: 1985
- Managed by: Indiana Department of Corrections

The Correctional Industrial Facility, otherwise known as the CIF, is an Indiana Department of Corrections prison located in Fall Creek Township, Madison County, near Pendleton. It is a medium-security prison. As of 2019, the prison housed 1,471 inmates, and employed 307 staff. Constructed in 1985, CIF formerly housed the Indiana Department of Correction's PEN food products plant. However, the food products plant was replaced by a brake refurbishing factory in partnership with the industrial company Meritor, which is the largest employer of offenders in the facility. Wendy Knight is the current Warden of CIF.

== History ==
CIF was originally called Correctional Industrial Complex and went by the initials C.I.C.

CIF was established in 1985 to create a prison in which inmates would work in a variety of industrial jobs while completing their sentences. The Department of Correction established a plant at CIF to process food grown on state farms at the Pendleton Correctional Facility formerly known as the Indiana Reformatory, and the State Prison in Michigan City, Indiana. The food was originally used only for state institutions, but later included some county jails.

At the beginning, the prison had a cattle and pig slaughterhouse, meat processing plant, creamery, bakery, and vegetable processing area. The slaughterhouse was closed in approximately 1998. Only the bakery closed January 1, 2008 and all the equipment was auctioned off. In its place, the former food processing plant buildings were used to rebuild engines and transmissions (and possibly also engines and differentials) for Ready-Built Transmissions.. This was later replaced by a brake refurbishing factory that is run in partnership with Meritor, an industrial company.

== Physical Description of the Prison ==
The Correctional Industrial Facility is located directly beside the maximum security Pendleton Correctional Facility. The institution contains administrative, industrial and education buildings. CIF does not have cells, it has mostly two man rooms; inmates are housed in six housing units which together hold up to 1,416 inmates. The housing units and a chapel are arranged around a large grass yard.

== Facility Visitation Policy ==
Visiting hours for Correctional Industrial Facility are Friday thru Sunday. 8:00am thru 2:00pm.

== Notable Inmates ==
Inmate Alan Matheny was held in the CIF for a brief time and was one of the notable murderers in Indiana. While at CIF, Matheny was granted an 8-hour leave to visit Indianapolis. Instead, he drove to Mishawaka, IN, and beat his ex-wife to death. Matheny was later executed in a separate prison. Due to the actions of this inmate, severe limitations were placed for many years on all inmates in the Indiana Department of Correction regarding activities outside prison walls and fences.

== Programs ==
The Correctional Industrial Facility has a large variety of programs for inmates. The programs offered by the Correctional Industrial Facility are:

Read-to-Me Literacy Program: This program allows inmates to tape record themselves reading books and to send them to their children. Approximately 40 inmates are involved.

P.L.U.S. Program (Purposeful Living Units Serve): This program is an attempt to instill positive change into the inmates through awareness and creating a purposeful life plan. For the religious inmates, a religious path is provided; for the non-religious inmates, a “character” path is provided. Approximately 118 inmates are involved with this program.

FIDO Program (Faith + Inmates + Dogs = Opportunity): This program allows offenders (known as dog handlers) to train a dog that has been saved from euthanasia. Offenders live with and care for the dogs while teaching them 5 basic commands. Dogs are available for outside adoption.

ICAN (Indiana Canine Assistance, Inc.): This program allows offenders to train assistance dogs for children and adults with disabilities.

9 Lives (Saving Felines): This program allows offenders to save a cat from euthanasia. Cats are housed with an offender and are available for outside adoption.

Therapeutic Community (TC): This unit is a specialized community designed to treat offenders with severe drug addictions. The program is a minimum of 8 months of intensive cognitive behavioral, evidenced based best practice counseling. Approximately 248 offenders are involved with this program.

Recreation Programs: These programs allow offenders to participate in programs in either the gymnasium, weight area, or on the 4-acre (16,000 m^{2}) field. They allow inmates to participate in tournaments and contests as well as be part of a sports league.

Ready Built Transmission Company: This program has not begun yet but is expected to begin by the end of 2007. This program will allow up to 300 offenders to take part in the building of automotive parts.

Inmate to Workmate Program: In this program, inmates are taught by Aramark Corporation in areas such as food handling. This program is a ten-week-long course and also has written examinations.

Kairos Program: This is an international Christian ministry program.

Thinking for a Change Program: In 22 sessions inmates are taught about cognitive behavior and use this to learn about beliefs, attitudes, and values.

PREP (Preventive Relationship Enhancement Program): Through this program inmates learn about what it takes to be an involved, responsible, and committed husband. It allows them to connect with their significant other while incarcerated and prepares them for lasting relationships.

Inside/Out Dads program: This allows incarcerated dads to overcome the challenges that go along with being a parent and how to be a good father.

GCD Community Service: Offenders spend time in this program keeping the grounds clean as well as maintaining Crosley Cemetery.

Road Crew: In cooperation with the Indiana Department of Transportation, offenders help keep interstates trash free.

Education: Offenders have several opportunities to receive an education while incarcerated.
