= Plainfield Correctional Facility =

Prison in Plainfield, Indiana, United States

Coordinates: 39°41′25″N 86°24′53″W

- Interactive map of Plainfield Correctional Facility
- Location: Plainfield, Indiana
- Status: open
- Capacity: 1658
- Opened: 1969
- Managed by: Indiana Department of Corrections

Plainfield Correctional Facility is a prison for men of the Indiana Department of Correction located in Plainfield, Indiana.

The facility opened in 1969 as the Indiana Youth Center.

As of 2016, the prison housed 1,659 inmates, and employed 333 staff.

== Notable inmates ==
- Mike Tyson (assigned to the Indiana Youth Center in April 1992, released on March 25, 1995) Tyson had to serve additional time after he threatened a guard, although full details of this were not released.
