= Madison County Bridge No. 149 =

- U.S. National Register of Historic Places
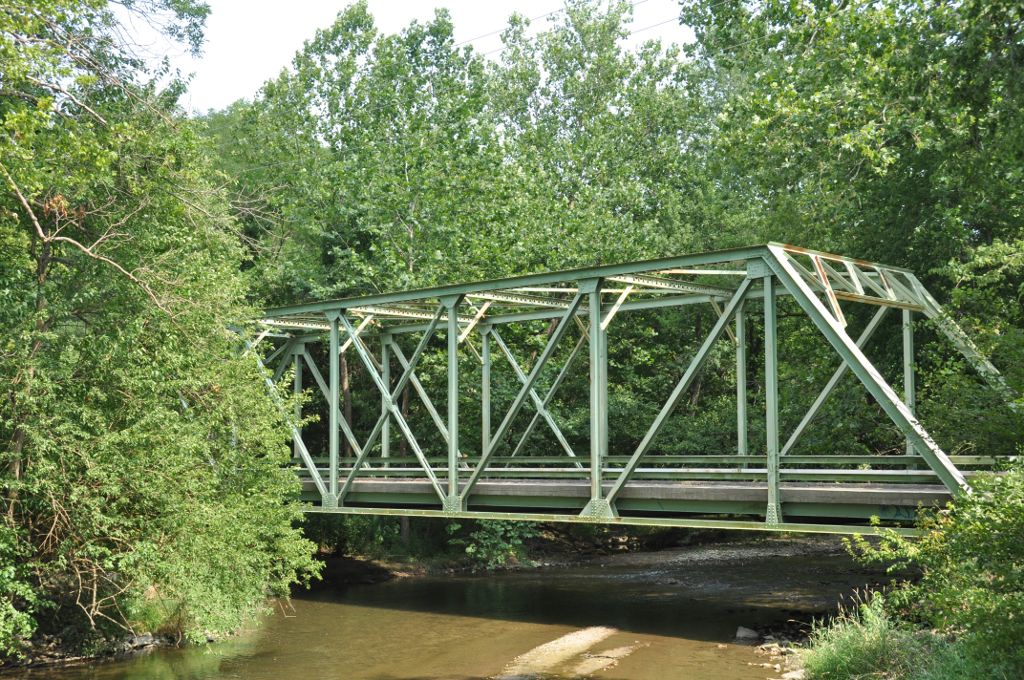
- Madison County Bridge No. 149, 2012

- Location within Indiana Location within the United States
- Location: Fall Creek Pkwy and Huntsville Pk. over Fall Creek, Pendleton, Indiana
- Coordinates: 40°0′28″N 85°44′8″W
- Area: less than one acre
- Built: c. 1920
- Architectural style: Pratt Through Truss
- NRHP reference No.: 08001212
- Added to NRHP: December 22, 2008

Madison County Bridge No. 149 is a historic Pratt Through Truss bridge located at Pendleton, Indiana. It was built about 1920, and measures 124 feet long. The bridges features rivets instead of pins in its construction.

It was listed in the National Register of Historic Places in 2008.
