= Indiana Department of Correction =

State government agency in Indiana

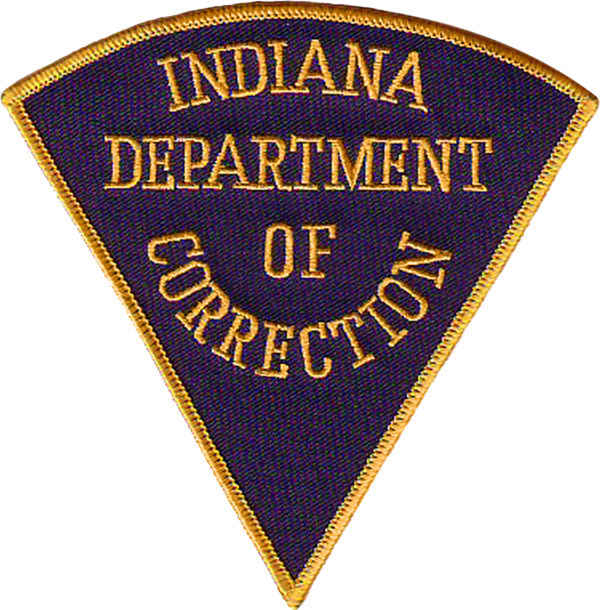

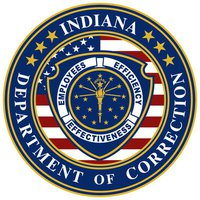
- Seal of the Indiana Department of Correction

Jurisdictional structure
- Operations jurisdiction: USA
- Indiana Prisons — green=state, red=federal (Hover mouse over pog to popup clickable link)
- Map of Indiana Department of Correction's jurisdiction
- General nature: Local civilian police

Operational structure
- Headquarters: Indianapolis, Indiana
- Agency executive: Lloyd Arnold, Commissioner

Website
- https://www.in.gov/idoc/

The Indiana Department of Correction (IDOC) operates state prisons in Indiana. It has its headquarters in Indianapolis.

== Population Summary ==
Per the Offender Population Statistical Report, provided by the Indiana Department of Correction Division of Data Science and Analytics, there were 22,758 adult male offenders (including 724 county jail “back-ups” and 23 in contracted beds) on January 1, 2025. This population is 13% below the operational bed capacity. There were 2,559 adult female offenders (including 74 county jail “back-ups” and 0 in contracted beds) on January 1, 2025. This population is 15% below the operational bed capacity. There were 274 juvenile male offenders in the department's facilities on January 1, 2025. This population is 53% below the operational bed capacity. There were 49 juvenile female offenders in the department's facilities on January 1, 2025. This population is 21% below the operational bed capacity. There were 6,963 adult males on parole in Indiana ( 6,649 Indiana parolees, 239 In-State, and 75 Out-State other jurisdiction parolees) on January 1, 2025. There were 745 adult females on parole in Indiana ( 708 Indiana parolees, 32 In-State, and 5 Out-State other jurisdiction parolees) on January 1, 2025. ** There were 338 adults of unrecorded sex on parole in Indiana on January 1, 2025. There were 321 adults admitted to IDOC ( 207 males, 99 females, and 15 adults of unrecorded sex) and 1,026 adults released from IDOC ( 858 males and 168 females) in January 2025. There were 23 juveniles admitted to IDOC ( 17 males, 6 females, and 0 juveniles of unrecorded sex) and 48 juveniles released from IDOC ( 37 males and 11 females) in January 2025. Previously

== Facilities ==
=== Adult facilities ===
Current facilities:

- Branchville Correctional Facility (Low Medium security) - Branchville
- Chain O'Lakes Correctional Facility (Minimum security) - Albion
- Correctional Industrial Facility (Low Medium security) - Pendleton
- Edinburgh Correctional Facility (Minimum security) - Edinburgh
- Heritage Trail Correctional Facility (Minimum security) - Plainfield
- Indiana State Prison (Maximum security) - Michigan City
- Indiana Women's Prison (Maximum security) - Indianapolis
- Indianapolis Re-entry Educational Facility (Minimum security) - Indianapolis
- Madison Correctional Facility (Women's Minimum security) - Madison
- Miami Correctional Facility (Maximum security) - Bunker Hill
- New Castle Correctional Facility (Low Medium and Maximum security) - New Castle
- Pendleton Correctional Facility (Maximum security) - Pendleton
- Plainfield Correctional Facility (Low Medium security) - Plainfield
- Putnamville Correctional Facility (Low Medium security) - Greencastle
- Reception Diagnostic Center (administrative) - Plainfield
- Rockville Correctional Facility (Women's Intake - Low Medium security) - Rockville
- South Bend Community Re-entry Center (Minimum security) - South Bend
- Wabash Valley Correctional Facility (High Medium security) - Carlisle
- Westville Correctional Facility (Low Medium security) - Westville

=== Juvenile facilities ===
Current facilities:

- LaPorte Juvenile Correctional Facility (Female/Maximum Security) - LaPorte
- Logansport Juvenile Correctional Facility (Intake/High Medium security) - Logansport
- Pendleton Juvenile Correctional Facility (Male/Maximum security) - Pendleton

==== Former facilities ====
- Bloomington Juvenile Correctional Facility
- Ft. Wayne Juvenile Correctional Facility
- Indianapolis Juvenile Correctional Facility
  - In 2009, residents were moved to the Madison Juvenile Correctional Facility and inmates from the Indiana Women's Prison moved into the facility after the juvenile population relocated
- North Central Juvenile Correctional Facility
- Northeast Juvenile Correctional Facility
- Plainfield Juvenile Correctional Facility
- South Bend Juvenile Correctional Facility
- Henryville Correctional Facility (Minimum security) - Henryville
- Medaryville Correctional Facility (MYC) Level 1 Minimum security
- Madison Juvenile Correctional Facility (Intake/Maximum security) - Madison
  - Located on the grounds of the Madison State Hospital campus, with the Madison Correctional Facility (Women). It was once the only state female juvenile facility in Indiana, but was replaced with LaPorte.

==== Fallen Personnel ====
Since the establishment of the Indiana Department of Correction, 12 correctional officers and 6 correctional employees have died in the line of duty.

== See also ==
- Incarcerated Population Statistical Reports
- List of law enforcement agencies in Indiana

National:

- List of United States state correction agencies
- List of U.S. state prisons
