= Daniel Holtzclaw =

American convicted rapist and former police officer (born 1986)

- Born: Daniel Ken Holtzclaw; December 10, 1986 (age 39); Guam
- Education: Eastern Michigan University
- Occupation: Former Oklahoma City Police Department patrol officer
- Convictions: First degree rape (4 counts); Second degree rape; Sexual battery (6 counts); Forcible oral sodomy (4 counts); Procuring lewd exhibition (3 counts)
- Penalty: 263 years imprisonment

Details
- Victims: 8
- Country: United States
- State: Oklahoma
- Date apprehended: August 21, 2014
- Imprisoned at: Lexington Assessment and Reception Center

Daniel Ken Holtzclaw (born December 10, 1986) is an American convicted serial rapist and former law enforcement officer. He was convicted in December 2015 of multiple counts of rape, sexual battery, and other sex offenses while on duty as an Oklahoma City Police Officer.

Holtzclaw was convicted of eighteen counts involving eight different women. According to the police investigators, Holtzclaw abused his position as an officer by running background checks to find information that could be used to coerce victims into sex. During the trial, the defense questioned the victims' credibility during cross-examination, bringing up their criminal records. Of the thirteen women who accused Holtzclaw, several had criminal histories such as drug arrests, and all of them were African American. The prosecution argued that victims were deliberately chosen by Holtzclaw for these reasons.

Holtzclaw pleaded not guilty to all charges. On December 10, 2015, he was convicted on 18 of 36 charges, and on January 21, 2016, he was sentenced to 263 years in prison, a de facto sentence of life in prison.

On August 1, 2019, Holtzclaw was denied an appeal by the Oklahoma Court of Criminal Appeals, which upheld both his convictions and prison sentence. The defense petitioned the Supreme Court of the United States on the basis that merging 17 cases together "strains credulity". On March 9, 2020, the Supreme Court refused the petition.

== Early life ==
Daniel Holtzclaw was born December 10, 1986, in the U.S. territory of Guam, to Eric, a white American, and a Japanese mother, Kumiko Holtzclaw. His father, Eric Holtzclaw is a lieutenant with the police department in Enid, Oklahoma. Holtzclaw graduated from Enid High School in 2005. While there, he played football as a linebacker, setting a school record for 25 tackles in a game. He played linebacker at Eastern Michigan University, where he graduated with a degree in criminal justice in 2010. After graduating, Holtzclaw unsuccessfully attempted to get drafted into the NFL. Following that, he joined the Oklahoma City Police Department.

== Criminal charges and conviction ==
=== Charges ===
Holtzclaw was accused of sexually assaulting multiple African American women over the period between December 2013 and June 2014, targeting those from a poorer, majority black portion of the city. According to police investigators, Holtzclaw ran background checks on women with outstanding warrants or other criminal records, and methodically targeted those victims.

The offense that led to Holtzclaw's arrest happened around 2:00 a.m. on June 18, 2014, after Holtzclaw had already completed his shift on the northeast side of Oklahoma City and was driving to his residence in his assigned police vehicle. During that time, police said, Holtzclaw made a traffic stop without reporting to police dispatch, running a records check on the driver, or revealing that he logged off of his patrol car computer. The driver was Jannie Ligons, a 57-year-old woman who was passing through the impoverished area that police said Holtzclaw was targeting. Unlike other women that police said he had accosted, she was not poor and had no police record. Ligons said that before forcing her to perform oral sex on him, Holtzclaw made her lift her shirt and pull down her pants. She testified that she had begged him to stop and was afraid for her life. Ligons promptly filed a police report.

When Holtzclaw reported to the OKCPD Springlake Division station the following afternoon for his daily 4 p.m. to 2 a.m. shift, he was pulled aside and driven to the department's Sex Crimes Unit by detectives Kim Davis and Rocky Gregory for questioning. After being Mirandized, Holtzclaw underwent a two-hour interrogation during which he denied all accusations of misconduct during the Ligons stop earlier that morning, and buccal swabs were taken for DNA comparison. At the conclusion of the interrogation, the two detectives told Holtzclaw that they believed that he was being untruthful based both on previous evidence and on statements made by his 25-year-old cohabiting girlfriend, that countered claims Holtzclaw had made to the detectives. While he was released after the interrogation, Holtzclaw's commission and entry cards, uniform shirt and pants, badges, firearms (handgun and shotgun), radio, and keys to his assigned police vehicle were seized, and he was placed on indefinite paid administrative leave. After further investigation eventually turned up a dozen additional complainants, Holtzclaw was arrested two months later on August 21, 2014, and originally charged with 16 (and eventually 36) counts of sexual abuse offenses including rape in the first and second degrees, sexual battery, procuring lewd exhibition, stalking, and forcible oral sodomy.

While reviewing Ligons' case, the two sex-crimes detectives remembered a previous report of forced oral sex committed by a police officer. Looking back through police records, the detectives found the report of a woman who said she was stopped in May 2014 and driven to an isolated area by an officer who forced her to perform oral sex. No action had been taken at the time of her report, but when the detectives contacted the woman, she showed them the route that the officer had taken on the night of the attack, and it matched Holtzclaw's GPS route that evening. The detectives then reviewed Holtzclaw's automatically recorded history of running names through the department's two databases, looking specifically for people who had been checked out multiple times, and they contacted those women. In the initial investigation, six women were willing to come forward to testify, and the GPS device on Holtzclaw's patrol car put him at the scene of the alleged incidents. Police records showed that he had called in for a warrant check on all of them. Their investigation covered a six-month period, beginning with the first woman who was willing to come forward.

=== Accusations of sexual assault and rape ===
Eventually, the prosecution investigation brought together 13 women who were willing to testify; published reports did not include information on any possible further women who were not willing to testify. The earliest incident discovered was from December 20, 2013, where a woman said she had been arrested for drug possession, was hospitalized, and was forced to give oral sex while she was handcuffed to her hospital bed. She said that he again made sexual advances to her on several occasions after she was released from jail. The woman said that she was led to believe that she would be released if she performed oral sex on Holtzclaw. "I didn't think that no one would believe me," she testified at a pretrial hearing. "I feel like all police will work together."

=== Jury selection ===
The final jury was an all-white jury which consisted of eight men and four women. Three black men were selected to the first pool of 24 potential jurors but were eventually rejected. The president of the Oklahoma City chapter of the NAACP expressed disappointment in the lack of minority jurors.

=== Trial ===
Holtzclaw, who had been on paid administrative leave until he was charged in August 2014, was fired in January 2015 and his trial began on November 2, 2015. He faced 36 charges, including sexual battery, assault, forcible oral sodomy, and stalking, and pleaded not guilty to all charges.

In court, prosecutors produced DNA evidence that was found on a triangle-shaped spot on the inside of Holtzclaw's uniform trousers, close to the zipper. After the hearing, his family made a statement that "The facts are that there is no DNA linking him to any of these women as far as was presented in the hearing." According to The New York Times, the DNA was a match to one of the victims, then aged 17. The DNA that was found was skin DNA; Holtzclaw's DNA was not found in the same area of clothing where the 17-year-old accuser's skin DNA was found. Holtzclaw's defense attorney explained the presence of the skin cells as "secondary transfer" whereby Holtzclaw's hands had possibly come into contact with the woman's skin cells when he searched her purse and later transferred them to the zipper area of his pants. During the trial, Holtzclaw did not contest having encountered the women, but he maintained his innocence. The defense concentrated on the accusers' lifestyles, calling just one witness, a former girlfriend of Holtzclaw's, who testified that he never exhibited sexually aggressive or inappropriate behavior around her.

On December 10, 2015, he was convicted on 18 of the charges, with the jury recommending that he serve 263 years in prison. Charges included first-degree rape, sexual battery, indecent exposure, stalking, forcible oral sodomy and burglary. He also faced second-degree rape by instrumentation and sexual battery charges. Claiming that evidence was withheld from the defense, Holtzclaw's attorney requested a new trial on January 20, 2016. The request was immediately denied by the judge.

A statement released by Oklahoma City Police Chief Bill Citty reads, in part: "We are satisfied with the jury's decision and firmly believe justice was served."

Soon after his sentencing, all of Holtzclaw's information was removed from the Oklahoma Department of Corrections (ODOC) website. The website shows data on a criminal's offense(s), mug shots, and jail location. When asked where Holtzclaw is currently located, ODOC spokesperson Terri Watkins replied, "We are not going to comment, it is a matter of security." It was later confirmed that he was being held under an alias in an undisclosed Oklahoma state prison.

In a 2016 interview, Holtzclaw reasserted his innocence.

== Appeal process ==
In a unanimous opinion on August 1, 2019, the Oklahoma Court of Criminal Appeals denied Holtzclaw's appeal. The ruling, written by Judge Dana Kuehn, rejected the appellant attorneys' claims of insufficient evidence and of improper procedure for bundling all 36 charges together. The opinion rejected allegations of a "circus atmosphere," noting that the jury returned not guilty verdicts on half of the charges. In his concurrence, Presiding Judge David B. Lewis referred to Holtzclaw as a "sexual predator." In their public condemnation of the ruling, Holtzclaw's family and supporters called Lewis' description a "vicious and false assertion."

On March 9, 2020, Holtzclaw's petition for a writ of certiorari was denied by the Supreme Court of the United States.

== Media coverage ==
According to The Atlantic, mainstream media gave Holtzclaw's trial for serial sexual attacks and rapes "relatively little" attention, although Black Lives Matter activists raised the matter in social media and helped bring attention to the ongoing judicial process. The Guardian reported that local activists were surprised that advocates from national women's groups, who had attended rape trials in the past, were absent from the courtroom at the start of the trial. Racial justice activists who had been very vocal about recent police-involved shootings were also accused of being largely absent from involvement in the Holtzclaw case.

In the absence of national attention, two Oklahoma City women, Grace Franklin and Candace Liger, formed the group OKC Artists for Justice to bring attention to the case. They said that they began to organize when Holtzclaw's bail was reduced from $5 million to $500,000 because it was so "insulting and infuriating", that they "wanted to stand up and say 'No. This is not OK. You cannot let a man who attacked and raped 13 women, per the charges, go home and have Christmas dinner with his family while those women are still in fear.'" Franklin said that they reached out to many national groups but received little response. She said, "It kind of fuels the feeling of separation between black feminists and so-called white feminists. Why aren't there more women out here of all shades, of all backgrounds for these women? Why are we doing this alone?"

An article in Cosmopolitan said that the media consistently ignores the violence perpetrated against black women and girls as compared to the coverage given to white women and girls. The article concluded:

Mainstream media failed these women. The lack of coverage thwarted a national conversation about sexual violence as a distinct form of police brutality. The stories of these women need to serve as an important intervention in conversations about anti-black state violence, rape culture, and the vulnerability of sex workers, ex-offenders, and current and recovering drug addicts to state and state-sanctioned violence. This verdict and Holtzclaw's forthcoming sentencing are entry points for a more thoughtful, humane, and transformative national dialogue about police brutality and sexual violence. With or without mainstream media coverage, we need to continue talking about this trial and everything it represents.

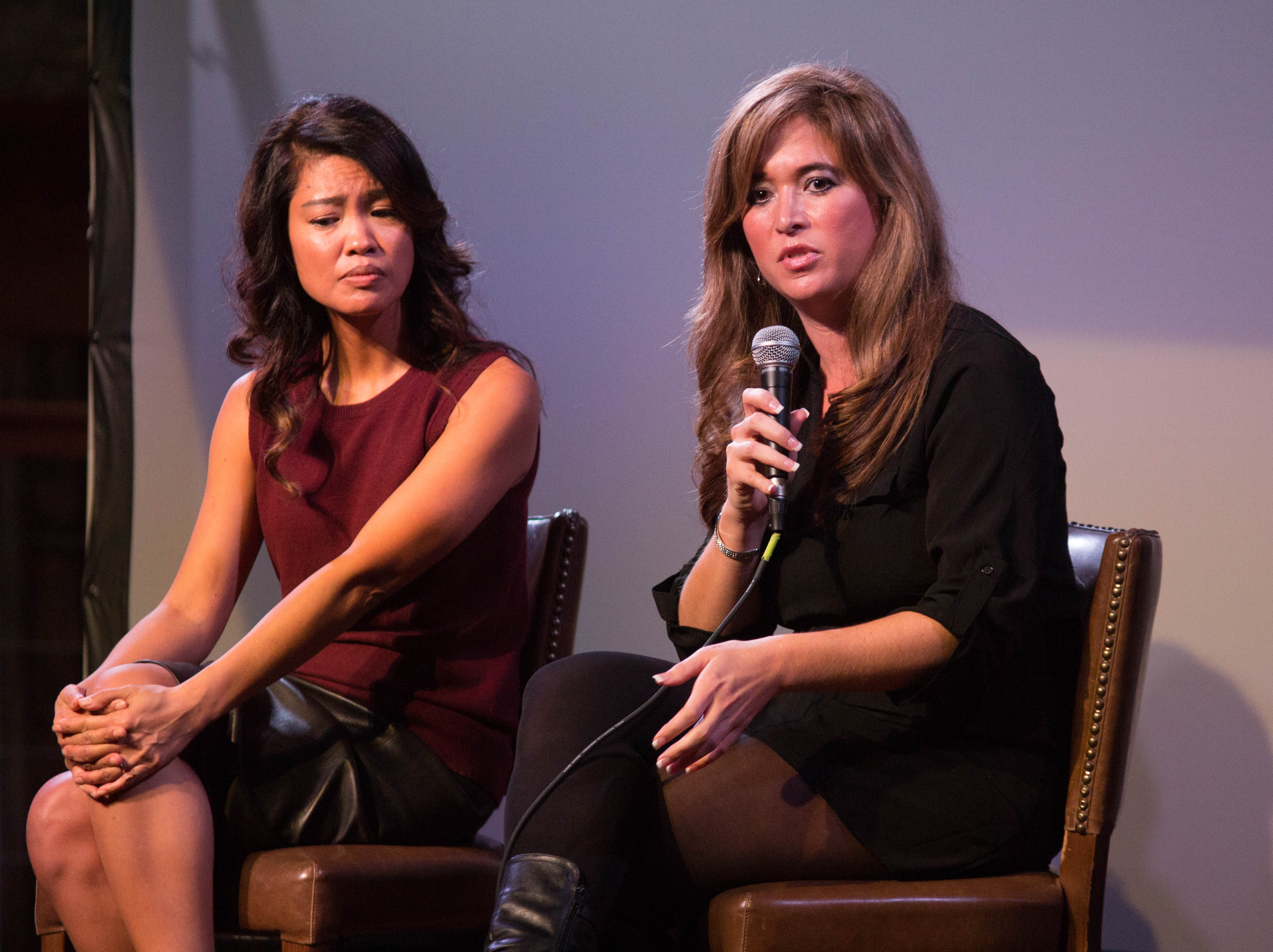
Michelle Malkin (left) with Holtzclaw's sister, Jenny, in 2016

Holtzclaw's case was part of an Associated Press report in a yearlong examination of sexual assaults by police. The report found that approximately 1,000 police officers lost their licenses for sex crimes during a six-year period. Reporting in the case indicates that this may be an undercount due to inconsistencies in how different jurisdictions deal with and report problem officers.

In February 2016, website SB Nation published a lengthy profile of Holtzclaw that focused on his college football career. The piece was immediately criticized as being apologetic and sympathetic to Holtzclaw; it was pulled within hours of publication. SB Nation subsequently suspended and later permanently shut down its long-form journalism program and cut ties with the freelance author responsible.

Conservative columnist Michelle Malkin has written that she believes Holtzclaw is innocent. Malkin screened two videos about the case at Stride Bank Center in Enid in 2016, and then a longer film at the same venue in 2018.

In 2017, KOKH-TV reported that the District Attorney and a Deputy Police Chief were aware that a DNA lab expert who testified against Holtzclaw made mistakes and that an unknown male DNA profile was among samples tested but not mentioned during the trial.

Jason Flom, a founding board member of the Innocence Project, dedicated a 2019 episode of his Wrongful Conviction podcast to interviews with Holtzclaw, his sister and a biologist who claims to have detected errors with the prosecution of the case.
