= Westville Correctional Facility =

Prison in Westville, Indiana, United States

- Interactive map of Westville Correctional Facility
- Location: 5501 S 1100 W Westville, Indiana
- Status: open
- Security class: mixed
- Capacity: 3100
- Opened: 1945 / 1977
- Managed by: Indiana Department of Correction

The Westville Correctional Facility, located in Westville, Indiana, is a state-operated prison for adult males. The facility contains sections of three levels of security. The average daily population in September 2006 was approximately 3,100. At Westville, 49% of the inmate population are people of color, slightly higher than the average of 42% for the Indiana Department of Correction (DOC) as a whole.

== History ==
Westville's history actually begins not with the opening of a new state prison but with the opening of a twenty-million dollar mental facility named the Northern Indiana Hospital. Created by the Indiana General Assembly in 1945, the facility admitted both mental patients and the criminally insane from Alaska and Indiana. Two years later, the hospital was renamed after Dr. Norman M. Beatty, a pioneer in hospital sanitation and a leading activist for improving mental health facilities. The hospital housed roughly 1750 patients in the civil section and around 500 patients in the maximum-security portion. Patients ages six and up were admitted into the hospital. Contained within the facility was an accredited school, bowling alley, beauty and barber shop, power plant, sewage disposal plant, fire department and security force. The hospital also helped students from the surrounding community benefit from internships in psychology, music, occupational, vocational and recreational therapy and nursing programs.

In 1977, legislation was passed that transformed the Norman Beatty Mental Hospital from a mental facility into a prison, the Westville Correctional Facility. In addition to the change in the type of residents at the facility, there was also a change in the type of care provided. This change was significant for the facility due to the vast difference between the two types of institutions. Through the two-year period between 1977 and 1979, the proportion of inmates increased and the number of mental patients decreased until, in June 1979, only inmates remained. Following the final transition into a prison came the construction of education and industrial complexes, gymnasium, multi-purpose building and chapel. In addition, a fence, extra lighting and watch towers were added for security reasons. Soon, what was originally intended to be a medium-security prison housing 1,200 inmates became a prison with inmates ranging from trustee offenders to maximum security and a population of over 3,000.

== Programs ==
Westville offers a wide variety of programs to help rehabilitate inmates and give back to the community. Perhaps the most important program is the prison's educational program, Reintegration into Society through Education (RISE). The inmates have the opportunity to take programs on ELS, general literacy, GED, and vocational programs in auto body, building trades, culinary arts, electronics and many others. One of the prison's stated philosophies is that the best way for a prisoner to reenter society is through education. Another program offered by Westville is Thinking for a Change, a course that attempts to teach inmates "an objective systematic approach to identifying thinking, beliefs, attitudes and values." However, at most, the inmates will usually only attend these "education opportunities" once a week. So, as far as the value of the education, that remains a separate issue. This course is an elective through a life changing program called Therapeutic Community at Westville Correctional Facility. "TC" is an intensive, peer driven, highly structured program that enforces cognitive thinking changes along with addiction education. This program aims to teach inmates positive social skills and to change the core thinking to more constructive and beneficial behaviors. In addition to these programs, other courses on substance abuse, transitioning from prison life back into society and many others are offered. Since the DOC began giving time cuts for inmates that complete certain educational programs, many have obtained earlier releases. The facility focuses on keeping fathers connected with their children while in prison through programs such as Inside Out Dads, a program developed for prisons by the National Fatherhood Initiative (http://www.fatherhood.org/) which tries to help offenders develop better parenting and fatherhood skills in order to become more involved with their children. The prison has a children's library for the fathers to use while visiting with their children. TC also has a new program aimed at helping offenders learn to manage money, become debt free, and to save and spend wisely. Dave Ramsey's nationally known program, Financial Peace University is now being taught within the Therapeutic Community. FPU is a biblically based curriculum that teaches offenders how to handle money God's ways.

A new program introduced by the prison is Mixed Up Mutts, which allows inmates to work with stray dogs and teach them basic obedience skills. The prison hopes that this program gives the inmates a very satisfying interaction with animals and that it has a general positive effect on them. The program was cancelled due to a lack of funding.

The prison also has many different industrial programs such as the Lions Club Eyeglass Recycling Program, Compost Recycling Program and Prison Enterprise Network (PEN). The Lions Club Program has inmates sort through and clean donated glasses which are then sorted by prescription. So far the program has processed over two million pairs of glasses. The Compost Program allows inmates to develop skills for using machinery from "shovels and rakes to operation of heavy equipment" while processing the compost in the surrounding area of the prison. The PEN program offers inmates the opportunity to make a range of different products that are sold both within the prison and commercially.

== Lawsuits ==
For Westville's relatively short history, it has had several prominent legal battles. In 1988, the prison was ordered to move 130 female inmates to other state facilities in order to comply with a lawsuit filed claiming that women received unfair treatment at the prison. According to several inmates, the women at Westville were not allowed options such as work opportunities outside the facility, General Equivalency Diploma program and literacy program.

As recently as 2004, Westville faced two legal battles, both pertaining to violations of freedoms. The first dealt with an officer assigned to the vehicle trap, Nancy Spiegla, who began to notice suspicious activity by two officers outside the gates of the prison. Spiegla witnessed two officers transferring large bags from cars. When the officers attempted to enter the facility, Speigla demanded that she be allowed to search their car, which was a routine duty of hers. However, the officers argued that law enforcement vehicles were exempt from this rule and rejected the car search. Later, Speigla decided to inform the assistant superintendent about the incident but was surprised when nothing was done about the matter and she was demoted to a lower-ranking position with a pay cut. Speigla pursued her complaint in court, which ultimately ruled in her favor. However, she was never given back her original position. This story brought attention to a major problem at Westville: drug trafficking by staff.

The second case involved Robert Badelle #7130 , an inmate at Westville, and a letter he wrote to the superintendent. In 1977, Badelle had been charged with murder and sentenced to a prison term of thirty years, even though Badelle and two Indiana police officers maintain that he is innocent. Upset one night about his imprisonment, Badelle decided to write the superintendent a letter in which he explained his discontent and his thoughts of escaping. On reading the letter, the superintendent alerted the DOC and five extra years were added onto Badelle's sentence. "The DOC claimed that mentioning one's intent to flee is the same as trying to escape…" Badelle filed a petition for writ of habeas corpus and won, and the added sentence was removed. In addition to this, the court ruled that Badelle should indeed be transferred to another prison. According to Badelle's lawyer, Westville is a very dangerous "hellhole" and is only meant for "short-termers" and younger men.

The most controversial lawsuit involved inmate Donald W. Holtz #863446 . In August 1986, Holtz was committed to the "Psychiatric Unit" of Westville because of an alleged suicide threat. Once there, he was put on several medications; however, no doctor examination was administered before or after he began taking the medication. After almost 17 months of taking the medication, Holtz one day refused to take his medications. He was then placed in a four-way restraint and given medication through a series of shots, all while remaining in seclusion for three days. He then filed suit over the inhumane conditions at the facility including overcrowding, beds placed fewer than 18 inches part and, worst of all, staff who failed to intervene in fights or sexual assaults.

On April 29, 2009, Westville Correctional Facility was sued by a former correctional officer, Nathan M. Smith, who was dismissed in January 2009 when he told an Internal Affairs officer that he requested a lawyer be present before being questioned about an undisclosed incident. In his lawsuit , Smith alleges Westville and its public information officer John Schrader violated Indiana's Access to Public Records Act ("APRA") when Schrader failed to disclose certain records relating to his dismissal and other alleged incidents that occurred while Smith was employed at Westville.

== Incidents ==
In May 2007, Officer Ashley S. Porter was injured on the job while performing her duties. Westville failed to grant her workers compensation and a suit was filed against the company for wrongful termination, harassment and medical bills accrued during her treatment for the work-related injury. The case is currently open.

In April 2000, an inmate from Westville, Phillip Woods #885529 , entered an industrial dishwasher and according to his mother, came out looking like a "skinned squirrel". Normally, the dishwasher is set to a temperature of around 150 degrees Fahrenheit but it had recently been moved up to 180 degrees on the recommendation of a recent health department visit. After Woods woke from his coma, he blamed the Aryan Brotherhood, a group of inmates at the prison, for his injuries. The DOC maintains that Woods had in the past gone into the dishwasher voluntary to win bets and that this occasion was no different. Woods died in the hospital in July 2002, two years after he was released, from complications from burns received during the incident.

Drug trafficking by staff was a problem at the facility in 1996. The Indiana State Police were observed frequently at the gates used by staff to enter the facility to conduct K-9 drug checks of vehicles and staff entering the facility.

The water was turned off twice within the years 2013–2015. The first was caused by the water tower on grounds malfunctioning. The second was when a pipe burst behind the educational complex. The water line was struck by the maintenance personnel who were digging near the main road. Westville had to bring in outside contractors to fix the problem. Offenders were given bottled water, at the staffs' leisure, and were still able to use toilets during the incident, at most twice a day. The offenders who used plastic bags to replace the toilet were not instructed to, since water was shut off and staff refused inmates basic human necessity to relieve themselves, and instead instructed the inmates to use the non-functioning toilets. The inmates then used trash bags to collect their fecal matter and disposed of it out of broken windows in the complexes.

== Notable inmates ==
- Richard Matthew Allen - Alleged perpetrator of the 2017 Delphi Murders. Prior to his trial, Allen was held at Westville as a pre-trial detainee for over a year, where he was kept in solitary confinement for 13 months, subjected to continuous video surveillance—including during attorney consultations—and involuntarily administered the antipsychotic medication Haldol following a mental health decline. Defense filings also highlighted safety concerns regarding prison guards who wore Odinist patches on their uniforms, which the Department of Correction ordered removed after defense attorneys raised the issue with the warden; defense counsel subsequently alleged that a guard involved had an Odinist symbol tattooed on his face. Following his 2024 conviction, Allen was initially held at the Pendleton Correctional Facility before being transferred in July 2025 to the Lexington Assessment and Reception Center in Oklahoma under an interstate corrections compact.
