= Lexington Assessment and Reception Center =

Maximum-security state prison in Lexington, Oklahoma

Coordinates: 35°00′59″N 97°13′06″W

Lexington Assessment and Reception Center (LARC)
- Location in Oklahoma
- Location: Lexington, Oklahoma
- Status: Operational
- Security class: Maximum
- Opened: 1978; 48 years ago
- Managed by: Oklahoma Department of Corrections
- Warden: Kameron Harvanek

Lexington Assessment and Reception Center (LARC) is an American maximum-security state prison for men located in Lexington, Cleveland County, Oklahoma, owned and operated by the Oklahoma Department of Corrections. The LARC complex also hosts the medium-security Lexington Correctional Center and the Rex Thompson Minimum Security Unit.

== History ==
It was first opened in 1978 and has a capacity of 1450 inmates. In May 2015, state officials said LARC was operating at 112% of capacity, and that overcrowding and understaffing had created security issues.

Five days out of the week, minimum security offenders work within the Prisoner Public Work Program or the City of Lexington, City of Noble, Oklahoma Department of Mental Health and Substance Abuse Services, Oklahoma Correctional Industries, and the Oklahoma Military Department.

Medium security offenders can attend the Lexington Career Tech Skills Center on the grounds of the facility. Second Chance Sanctuary, an animal rescue, in conjunction with Friends of Folks, operate a program for long-term offenders to train dogs for donation to nursing homes or for use as companion dogs.

== Prisoner life ==
=== Education ===
In 2020, a campus of the Oklahoma Baptist University was established in the prison.

== Notable Inmates ==
Inmate Name	Register Number	Status	Details
Michael J. Bever	793381	Serving five consecutive life sentences without the possibility of parole, plus 28 years	Convicted of murdering his parents and three siblings with the help of his brother on July 22, 2015
Charles A. Dyer	659682	Serving a 30-year sentence.	Rape of 7 year old daughter
Daniel Holtzclaw	731154	Serving a 263-year sentence.	Former police officer who was convicted of multiple rapes and sexual assaults.
Richard Matthew Allen		Serving a 130-year sentence.	Perpetrator in the 2017 Delphi Murders in Indiana. Transferred to Oklahoma as part of Indiana's state agreement in July 2025.
