= Edinburgh Correctional Facility =

Prison in Indiana, United States

- Interactive map of Edinburgh Correctional Facility
- Location: Camp Atterbury, Edinburgh, Indiana, United States; 39.353547°N 86.040428°W
- Status: Operational
- Security class: Minimum
- Capacity: 344
- Managed by: Indiana Department of Correction
- Website: http://www.in.gov/idoc/2399.htm

Edinburgh Correctional Facility is a minimum-security work camp located in the middle of Camp Atterbury, a military training camp near Edinburgh, Indiana. The inmates work on the grounds of Camp Atterbury and on road crews with the Indiana Department of Transportation and park maintenance with the Indiana Department of Natural Resources. The maximum population, which has doubled in the past year, is 344 adult males.

To be able to get into Edinburgh, offenders must have a clean disciplinary record and have less than four years left in their sentence. Two escapes occurred in 2012. On May 1, 2012, a 32-year-old inmate being held on a two-year sentence for theft escaped and was apprehended the next day. Then, on June 18, 2012, an inmate serving a 10-year sentence for arson escaped during work duty and was caught the same day. One death has occurred. Riots have not occurred.

== History ==
During World War II, Camp Atterbury served as a detention center for prisoners of war. After the war, some of the buildings were converted into a military training camp, while others were abandoned. In 1982, the Indiana Department of Correction wanted to open a work release center for men. They initially moved into one of the abandoned buildings. Three years later, the center expanded into a new building.

In May 1988, the increase in female offenders in the state forced the Department of Correction to find additional space for women. Thus, the men were transferred from the work release center to a prison in Rockville and Atterbury became a correctional center for females. Two years later, the change of inmates was reversed; the women went to Rockville and 112 men came back to Camp Atterbury. In 1991, the facility was renamed Edinburgh Correctional Facility. At that time, the superintendent was John VanAtta.

== Buildings ==
Two barracks that housed World War II prisoners of war are still used for dorms to house the inmates. One other World War II building is now used for visitation. All the original buildings are still standing, though they have been renovated inside and out by the offenders. Two new barracks were finished in March 2007, allowing the facility to house more inmates. A trailer, which has been renovated, is used as a control room. Construction of a new building, which has yet to commence, has been rumored. Final plans of a new building are unknown. The original numbers that were assigned by the Army are still in use by the prison today. Inmates are brought in through building 641, and go out and come back from work in building 640. These numbers are used by the guards.

== Current information ==
Edinburgh is a Level 1 minimum-security prison, which means the offenders work outside of the fence during the day. Originally, Edinburgh inmates did their work release duties only on the grounds of Camp Atterbury. Then in 1999, the jobs of the inmates expanded to include working with DNR and INDOT. Edinburgh currently has 35 work crews which are sent out and assigned different duties every day. The inmates are responsible for maintaining the grounds of the entire military base, which encompasses 3,600 acres (1,457 ha). Some crews work for Johnson County helping to maintain parks or other county-owned places. Other crews work for INDOT (Indiana Department of Transportation) or the Department of Natural Resources at Brown County State Park.

There are no sex offenders or murderers within the facility. There are no female offenders in the Edinburgh facility, but there are female correctional officers, and site leaders. It is a "One Out" facility, which means a level one minimum security prison in which the inmates work outside the prison's grounds. Edinburgh Correctional Facility is one of two level one facilities in Indiana to have a fence around it. The main purpose of the fence is to keep the prison separated from the military camp.

== Work hours, visitation and inmate programs ==
The men can work 5 days a week from 8am to 4pm or 7am to 3pm, depending on the work site. Three-quarters of the men work every day. The kitchen is run by inmates 20 hours a day.

Visitation is allowed 4 days a week, on Sunday, Monday, Friday, and Saturday.

Programs Edinburgh offers:

- Thinking For a Change (behavior modification)
- Inside Out Dads (for fathers to become connected to their children again)
- Nurturing Fathers
- Reformative Residential Re-Entry Program
- Civilian Labor Inmate Program
- Department of Labor Apprenticeship Program

Also available in Food Service:

- Inmate to Workmate (food service training)

== List of superintendents ==
- John VanNatta
- Ron Anderson
- Paul O’Haver
- Mike Renihan
- Jan Resig
- John Hardwick
- Brian Pearson
- Frances Osburn
- Bryan Dobbs
