= Huntsville, Madison County, Indiana =

Huntsville, Indiana
- Unincorporated community
- Location within Indiana Location within the United States
- Coordinates: 40°00′31″N 85°43′49″W
- Country: United States
- State: Indiana
- County: Madison
- Township: Fall Creek
- Elevation: 869 ft (265 m)
- ZIP code: 436638
- FIPS code: 18-35320
- GNIS feature ID: 436638

Huntsville is an unincorporated community in Fall Creek Township, Madison County, Indiana, located just across Fall Creek from and surrounded on three sides by Pendleton, Indiana.

== History ==
Huntsville was laid out in 1830. It was named for one of its founders, Eleazer Hunt. A post office was established at Huntsville in 1847, and remained in operation until it was discontinued in 1878. The town is bisected by a conjunction of Indiana 9 and Indiana 38.
