= Indianapolis Juvenile Correctional Facility =

Defunct American juvenile facility (1907–2009)

Coordinates: 39°48′04″N 86°17′25″W

The Indianapolis Juvenile Correctional Facility was a minimum, medium, and maximum state juvenile facility of the Indiana Department of Correction. It was located on Girls School Road, 8 miles (13 km) west of downtown Indianapolis. The facility housed 185 female inmates ranging in age from twelve years to twenty-one years. The facility was originally established in 1907 as an all-girls school and was known for most of its history as the Indiana Girls School. In 2006, juvenile male offenders were assigned to the facility as well. In late 2007 all male offenders were transferred to other state facilities and the Indianapolis Juvenile Correctional Facility reverted to being an all female facility. In 2009 the girls were moved to the Madison Juvenile Correctional Facility, and the former IJCF became the current location of the Indiana Women's Prison.

== Early history ==
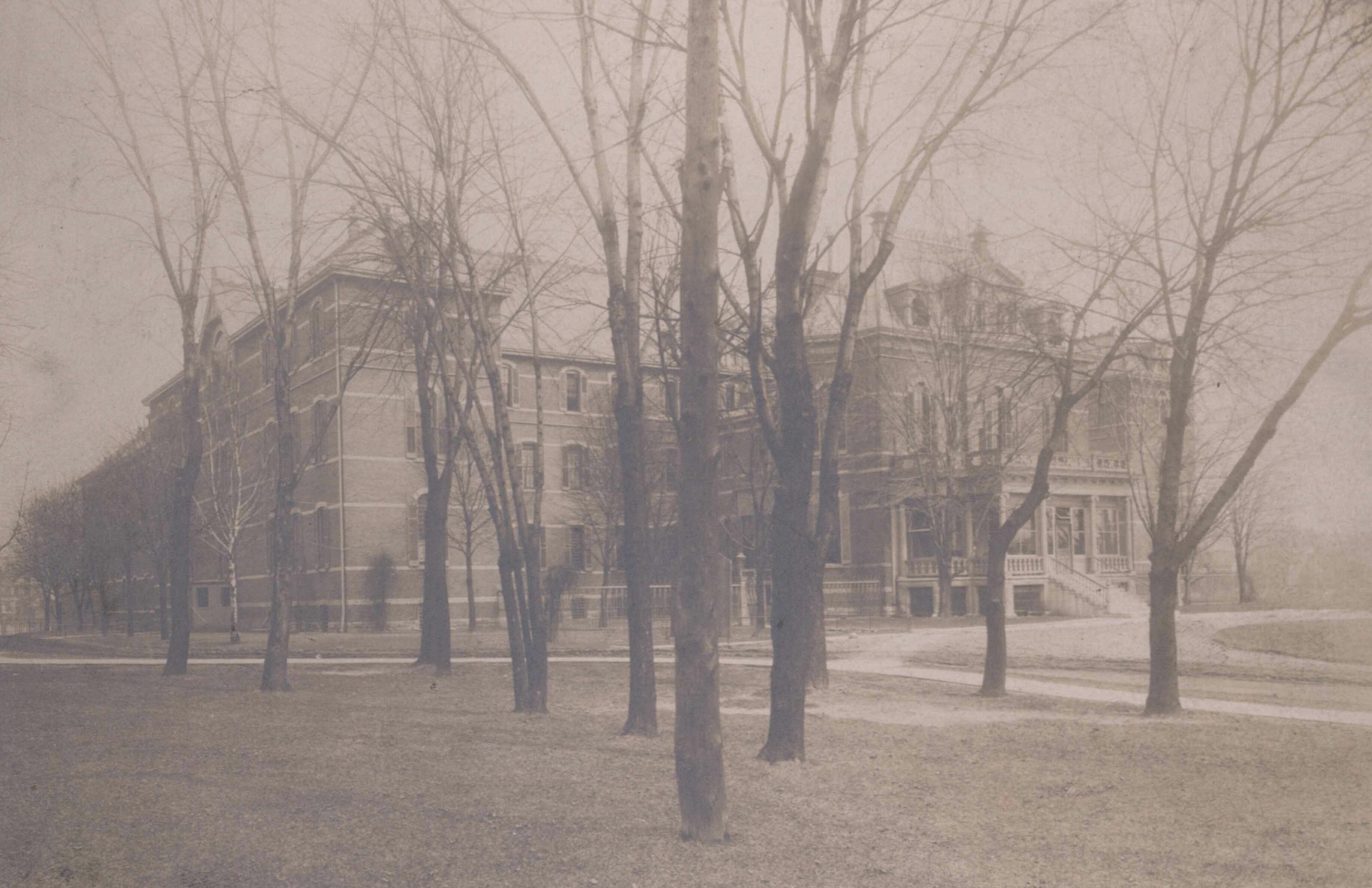
Indiana Industrial School for Girls, circa 1907

In 1869, the Indiana State Legislature established the Indiana Reformatory Institution for Women and Girls stating that "There shall be established as soon as possible after the taking effect of this act, at or near the city of Indianapolis, an institution to be known as the Indiana Reformatory Institution for Women and Girls." This was the first prison exclusively for females in the nation. Prior to the act, female juvenile offenders were taken care of by their county jails. In 1899, the girls were given separate quarters from the women (but were still on the same grounds), and the institution was renamed the Indiana Industrial School for Girls. However, the girls and the women were still housed under the same roof. Prior to the separation, the girls and the women would do activities together such as prayer services and household work. The women were thought to have a negative effect on the young girls' morals, so in 1907 the girls moved to an entirely different facility. This facility was named the Indiana Girls' School, and the women's facility was renamed the Indiana Women's Prison. According to correspondents of the time, the Indiana Girls' School was built on the belief that firmness, fairness, and kindness were the keys to changing the girls' attitudes. Girls who were "epileptic, insane, feeble-minded, paralytic, pregnant, or had a contagious disease" were not admitted to the facility. Instead, these girls were sent back to their homes. The school's first superintendent was Charlotte Dye. A state law brought any girl who was convicted of activities which included but were not limited to: visiting gambling places, trespassing on railroad property, patronizing liquor saloons, using bad language, or smoking cigarettes to the school.

== Notable Incidents: 1914-2009 ==
In 1914, one girl in the school lost her life to a diphtheria epidemic which sickened forty-six other girls. The school first started a parole system in 1926. On September 10, 1964, the Indiana State Police were dispatched to the school in order to stop a riot that involved 200 girls. A Grand Jury started an investigation of the riot, and discovered that there were many factors that led to the incident, including homosexuality, drug usage, and a lack of respect for the school's superintendent. The school also had 65 girls escape during this time. In 1985, some girls filed a lawsuit against the school alleging that the school had made them stay in their cells wearing nothing but socks and underwear, but this charge was later dropped.

In 1996, the facility was renamed the Indianapolis Juvenile Correctional Facility. Despite the name change, the facility functioned as an all-girls school until January 2006, when juvenile males were moved onto the same grounds from the former Indiana Boys' School in Plainfield, Indiana (though they were later removed from the facility, making it all-female once again).

On July 7, 2009, Department of Corrections Commissioner Buss announced that Indianapolis Juvenile Correctional Facility's population would move to a site near a state hospital in Madison, Indiana ending the 102 years as the Indiana Girls School. The Indiana Women's Prison, located Downtown Indianapolis, moved to the old Girls School to accommodate overcrowding. Some male inmates located near the Plainfield Correctional Facility were moved into the old Women's Prison downtown. All the changes were made by the end of 2009.

== Inmate Population ==
Currently, the Indianapolis Juvenile Correctional Facility houses only females, the majority of which are between the ages of 14 and 16 years, approximately 60% Caucasian, 35% African-American, and 5% other.

== Buildings and Grounds ==
There is a maximum security unit, an intake orientation unit, and a special needs unit. The facility has an administration building, thirteen single-story housing units, infirmary, dining hall, and school. There is also a gymnasium and a sanatorium in the recreation building. During the years of 2002–2003, the facility added a perimeter fence along with renovations to the cooking, dining, housing, visitation, and health care facilities.

== Education ==
In 1951, the Eliza Hendricks Junior-Senior High School was established. The school is fully accredited by the North Central Association. The class sizes are relatively small. All of the staff members of the school have a special education certificate, as nearly 40% of the students are classified as special needs students. In recent years, the school has 30 GED graduates and has issued 551 credits.

== Programs ==
The facility offers many programs to its inmate population, including substance abuse programs designed to teach the girls about the dangers and effects that substance abuse entails. Also offered is the Healthy Relationships program, which focuses on dealing with relationships with family members, friends, and significant others. The facility also offered various re-entry programs.
