= California Correctional Training and Rehabilitation Authority =

Government agency

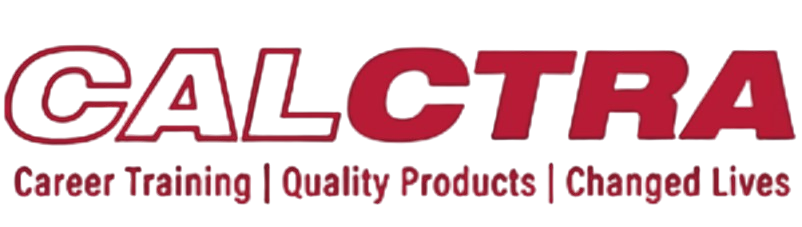

Agency overview
- Formed: September 29, 1982
- Jurisdiction: California
- Headquarters: Folsom, CA
- Agency executives: Jeff Macomber, Chair of California Correctional Training and Rehabilitation Board; Suzie Changus, Director
- Parent department: Dept. of Corrections and Rehabilitation
- Key documents: Penal Code § 2800 et seq.; Stats. 1982, Ch. 1549
- Website: www.calctra.ca.gov

The California Correctional Training and Rehabilitation Authority (CALCTRA) , formerly California Prison Industry Authority (CALPIA), provides job training programs within the California Department of Corrections and Rehabilitation (CDCR) institutions. It is overseen by the 11-member Correctional Training and Rehabilitation Board, which is chaired by the CDCR Secretary. CALCTRA has more than 5,600 incarcerated assignments in career technical education programs, manufacturing, consumable, and service enterprises. CALCTRA's administration offices are in Folsom, CA.

== Statutory objectives ==
(Under the Penal Code Sections 2800-2818):

- To develop and operate industrial, agricultural and service enterprises that provide work opportunities for offenders under the jurisdiction of CDCR, and to serve government agencies with products and services commensurate with their needs.
- To create and maintain working conditions as similar as possible to those of private industry, to help offenders work productively to earn funds, and to acquire or improve effective work habits and occupational skills.
- To operate self-supporting offender work programs through the generation of funds from the sale of products and services, avoiding the costs of alternative CDCR offender programs. (CALCTRA receives no annual appropriation from the legislature.)

== Organization ==
CALCTRA is a self-supporting state entity that reduces recidivism, increases prison safety, and enhances public safety by providing incarcerated individuals with productive work and training opportunities. Its mission is to provide incarcerated individuals with life-changing career development opportunities so they may be productive, successful contributors when they return to their communities. Its program goals support CDCR's public safety mission by helping incarcerated participants with job skills, good work habits, basic education and job support in the community, giving them the best post-release chances of not returning to prison. CALCTRA participants receive industry-accredited certifications that employers seek. Incarcerated individuals apply to be in the program. In addition to receiving industry-accredited certifications, incarcerated individuals who participate in CALCTRA can earn up to 12 weeks of sentence reduction credits per year.

A November 2021 study by the University of California Irvine Center for Evidence-Based Corrections found lower recidivism rates among incarcerated individuals who participated in a CALCTRA (Formerly CALPIA) program. The study created statistically matched individuals with results showing that participation in CALCTRA is associated with reduced offending overall. The study compared CALCTRA participants with at least 6 months in the program and released between August 2014 and July 2018 with incarcerated individuals who were accepted into the CALCTRA program and put on a Waitlist but were released before they could actively participate. By three years after release, only 15 percent of CALCTRA participants had been returned to custody, which means 85% of CALCTRA participants do not return to prison.

The UCI study utilized 8,603 incarcerated individuals released from custody from CDCR. Of these individuals, 2,453 participated in CALCTRA and 6,150 qualified for CALCTRA but never had the opportunity to participate.

== History and oversight ==
California Correctional Industries was formed in 1947, and renamed California Prison Industry Authority (CALPIA) in 1982. CALPIA was renamed the California Correctional Training and Rehabilitation Authority (CALCTRA) in 2026. CALCTRA is overseen by the Correctional Training and Rehabilitation Board, which acts like a corporate board of directors. The 11-member board is chaired by the CDCR Secretary. The Governor appoints four members, the Senate appoints two members, the Assembly appoints two members, and there are two statutory members including the Secretary of Transportation (or designee) and the Director of General Services (or designee) who also serve on the board.

On January 1, 2026, Senate Bills 157 and 857 changed the name to California Correctional Training and Rehabilitation Authority (CALCTRA).

== Customer base ==
The goods and services produced by CALCTRA's enterprises are sold predominately to departments of the State of California, as well as to other government entities.

CDCR is CALCTRA's largest customer and accounted for 64% of sales in FY 2024-25. Other state customers include:

- Department of Motor Vehicles (DMV)
- Department of State Hospitals (DSH)
- Department of Health Care Services (DHCS)
- Department of Transportation (Caltrans)
- Department of Forestry and Fire Protection (CAL FIRE)
- California Highway Patrol (CHP)
- California Department of Veterans Affairs (CalVet)
- Department of General Services (DGS)
- California Military Department
- Department of Parks and Recreation (DPR)

== Financial benefits to state agencies and taxpayers ==
CALCTRA's incarcerated programming saves the state's General Fund millions of dollars annually through lower offender recidivism. It also saves CDCR millions by providing over 5,600 alternatively funded programming slots for offenders that CDCR does not have to fund.

To achieve its mission, CALCTRA has three program goals:

- Enhance Incarcerated Individuals' Lives to Reduce Recidivism
- Foster Continuous Improvement and Professional Development
- Produce High Quality, Sustainable Products and services for Customers

== Accredited certifications ==
CALCTRA invests in curriculum for incarcerated individuals, offering more than 128 nationally recognized accredited certifications, such as AutoCAD, computer coding, dental technology, optician, food handling, laundry, welding, braille, industrial safety and health, forklift driver, mechanical systems, healthcare facilities maintenance and much more.

In FY 2024-25, 5,900 CALCTRA participants successfully completed an accredited certification program. CALCTRA invests in curriculum for incarcerated individuals offering 128 nationally recognized accredited certifications in optical, dental, welding, computer-aided design (AutoCAD), computer coding, healthcare facilities maintenance, data entry clerk, maintenance mechanic, forklift driver, pre-apprentice carpentry, pre-apprentice construction labor, pre-apprentice ironworkers and many more programs.

<https://www.calctra.ca.gov/wp-content/uploads/calctra/news/Report%20To%20The%20Legislature%20FY%202024-25-CALCTRA.pdf>
