= Putnamville Correctional Facility =

Prison in Indiana, United States

Coordinates: 39°33′56″N 86°53′09″W

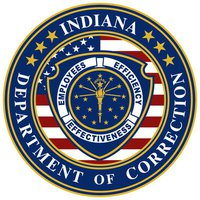
- Interactive map of Putnamville Correctional Facility
- Location: Greencastle, Indiana
- Status: open
- Security class: medium security
- Capacity: about 2400
- Opened: 1914
- Managed by: Indiana Department of Corrections

The Putnamville Correctional Facility, located in Warren Township, Putnam County, near Greencastle, Indiana, is a medium-security prison for men located on 4,350 acres (17.6 km^{2}) in Putnam County, Indiana (the west-central part of the state, 3.8 miles West of U.S. Routes 231 and 40). It currently houses approximately 2,400 inmates. Established in 1914, the prison was known for nearly 70 years as the Indiana State Farm. Inmates, nearly all of whom were serving time for minor offenses, worked in the prison's extensive farm and dairy operations.

In the late 1960s and early 1970s the facility was divided, with laundry and mess areas located near the complex of dormitories on a hill overlooking "the pit", the brickyard west of the dorms and far below. The residents were mainly of non-violent nature, serving no more than one year.

The Brick Yard (also known as Gladiator School) was a half-mile walk to the shovels, wheelbarrows and sledges. The dome-shaped brick kilns would be fired to bake the bricks, which were removed with propane-powered forklifts. Lift drivers did the dangerous job of manipulating the hot skids of brick out of the eight-foot arched doorway, bending over the steering wheel to avoid injury from the small entrance.

In the mid-1980s, The Farm was transformed into a medium-security prison for felons. Putnamville was again at the center of controversy in the late 1990s regarding allegations of racism, violence and drug trafficking by a group of employees known as "the Brotherhood". This controversy led to new state laws regarding prison oversight in Indiana.
