= Murders of Abigail Williams and Liberty German =

2017 murder case in Indiana, US

- Liberty German (left) and Abigail Williams (right)
- Date: February 13, 2017
- Time: 2:07 p.m. – 5:30 p.m. (EST)
- Location: Near Monon High Bridge, Deer Creek Township, Carroll County, Indiana, U.S.; 40°35′20.7″N 86°38′34.2″W
- Type: Child murder
- Perpetrator: Richard Matthew Allen
- Deaths: Abigail Joyce Williams; Liberty Rose Lynn German
- Burial: IOOF Memorial Gardens (Liberty German); IOOF Riverview Cemetery (Abigail Williams)
- Coroner: Jordan Cree, Carroll County
- Convictions: Murder (2 counts), felony murder (2 counts)
- Sentence: 130 years in prison

The murders of Abigail Williams and Liberty German, also known as the Delphi murders, occurred on February 13, 2017, in Delphi, Indiana, United States. Their bodies were discovered near the Monon High Bridge Trail, part of the Delphi Historic Trails, from which the girls disappeared the previous day. The murders received extensive media coverage, in part due to video and audio recordings released by law enforcement that came from German's smartphone, which recorded an individual believed to be the killer.

The case remained unresolved for five years until 2022 when Richard M. Allen was arrested and charged with the murders. He was found guilty in 2024 and sentenced to 130 years in prison.

== Murders ==
At 1:30 p.m. on February 13, 2017, 13-year-old Abigail "Abby" Joyce Williams (born June 23, 2003) and 14-year-old Liberty Rose "Libby" Lynn German (born December 27, 2002) were dropped off by German's older sister, Kelsi German, on County Road 300 North, east of the Hoosier Heartland Highway. The girls were hiking on the Monon High Bridge over Deer Creek, among woodland in remote Deer Creek Township. At 2:07 p.m., German used social media to post a photo of Williams walking the bridge; after this incident, they were not heard from again.

They were reported missing at 5:30 p.m. after they had failed to meet German's father at 3:15 p.m. The families initially searched for the girls themselves before calling the police. Authorities searching the area did not initially suspect foul play in the disappearance. This changed when the bodies of the girls were found around noon the next day, about 0.5 miles (0.80 km) east of the abandoned Monon High Bridge. The bodies were found on the north bank of Deer Creek.

== Investigation ==
Police did not initially release details of how the girls were murdered. As early as February 15, 2017, Indiana State Police began circulating a still image of an individual reportedly seen on the Monon High Bridge Trail near where the two friends were murdered; the grainy photograph appears to capture a white male, hands in pockets, head down, walking on the rail bridge, towards the girls. A few days later, the person in the photograph, dubbed the "Bridge Guy", was named the prime suspect in the double-homicide.

At a press conference on February 22, law enforcement released an audio recording during which the voice of the suspect, although muffled, is heard saying, "Down the hill." Officials credited the source of the audio and images to German's smartphone and further regarded her as a hero for having had the presence of mind and fortitude to secretly record the exchange. Police indicated that additional evidence from the phone had been secured, but would not release further details so as not to "compromise any future trial." By this time, the reward offered in the case was set at US$41,000 (equivalent to $53,900 in 2025).

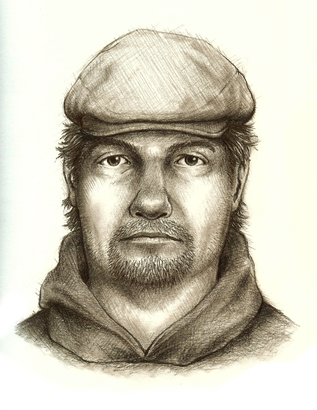
Delphi murder suspect sketch

On July 17, police distributed a composite sketch of someone sought as a person of prime interest in the murders. The sketch was apparently created from eyewitness accounts of a hiker on the Delphi Historic Trails the day the girls vanished.

On April 22, 2019, Indiana State Police announced a "new direction" in the case and released a new sketch of the suspect, while urging the public to look at the sketch, listen to the audio, watch how the man walks on the bridge and send tips to the tipline email. Investigators stated they had reason to believe that the suspect might be hiding in plain sight and was almost certainly familiar with the Delphi area, from living there, working there or for other reasons. An additional plea was made for help in identifying the driver of a vehicle left abandoned off the Hoosier Heartland Highway in Delphi, at the former Child Services office, between noon and 5 p.m. on the day of the murders.

== Arrest and developments ==
In September 2022, investigators reviewed a misfiled tip after a volunteer file clerk discovered the error. Richard Allen's last name was recorded incorrectly on the tip when submitted, and the file was therefore wrongly marked as "cleared"; the file clerk deduced that the tip from years earlier was regarding Richard Allen, and brought it to the case's investigator. In the tip, Richard Allen self-reported three days after the murders to being on the trails on the day of the murders and seeing three girls on the trails.

On October 26, 2022, Richard Allen was taken into custody and appeared in court on October 28. On October 31, Indiana State Police announced that Allen had been charged with two counts of murder in the case. He had pled not guilty. Time described the arrest as "the first major break in a case that has captivated national attention for nearly six years." His trial, originally scheduled to start March 20, 2023, was postponed to allow the defense team to review discovery materials. Two public defenders were appointed to represent Allen.

On November 29, 2022, Judge Frances Gull issued an order to unseal the probable cause affidavit that led to Allen's arrest. According to the redacted document, video footage recovered from German's phone showed one of the victims mentioning "gun" as a man wearing a dark jacket and jeans approached them and ordered them to go "down the hill." Investigators believe Allen is the man seen in the video. Investigators also found a ".40-caliber unspent round" less than two feet from one victim's body, but between the two victims. It was later determined that the round came from a gun owned by Allen. A witness said she saw a man walking away from the bridge "wearing a blue colored jacket and blue jeans and was muddy and bloody." Another witness and a tip mentioned that a car was parked "oddly" and appeared to be parked in a way as if to hide its license plate. Investigators said the description of the vehicle matched a vehicle that Allen owned in 2017.

According to a probable cause affidavit, Allen was interviewed by the police in 2017, and said he was on the trail that afternoon for around two hours. The document also said that in a subsequent interview in October 2022, Allen told authorities he had worn "jeans and a black or blue jacket" that day and had gone to the bridge to "watch fish."

== Perpetrator ==
Richard Matthew Allen (born September 1972) grew up in Mexico, Indiana. He played football, track and field at North Miami Middle/High School in neighboring Denver and graduated in 1991. He studied accounting at Ivy Tech Community College and had short stints in the U.S. Army and National Guard. He later married and had one daughter. From 2003 until 2013, he worked as a store manager at a Logansport Walmart, during which time (in December 2006) he moved from Mexico to Delphi. He then worked at CVS Pharmacy stores in neighboring Peru and in Delphi, receiving his pharmacy technician license in February 2018.

Shortly after the murders, Allen told his wife that he had been on the trail the day the girls went missing, and his wife mentioned that the police were looking to talk to people who may have information. He self-reported to a Department of Natural Resources officer three days after the murders.

After his 2022 arrest, Allen told authorities that on the day of the murders he was at his mother's house in Peru while his wife was working. Allen estimated that he left the house around 11:15 a.m. and arrived on the Monon High Trail an hour later. Allen said he saw three girls passing by on the trail and no one else afterward, and that he watched the stocks ticker on his phone while walking on the trail.

== Trial and sentencing ==
On December 2, 2022, Judge Gull issued a gag order until January 2023. Allen's defense attorneys argued in a motion to move the trial out of Carroll County, based on concerns about juror bias due to what the attorneys described as the "extensive media attention" and the "highly publicized nature of the case" in the local area.

In October 2023, Judge Gull removed the defense attorneys, citing gross negligence due to crime scene photos being leaked from their office. The attorneys' removal was appealed to the Indiana Supreme Court in which the justices of the Indiana Supreme Court reinstated the defense attorneys to the case.

The trial began on October 18, 2024, in Delphi. During the trial, prosecutors stated both girls had their throats cut. Williams was found fully clothed in German's clothing, whereas German was discovered nude. An unspent .40 caliber bullet was discovered between the bodies, and was later linked to Allen's gun through the "quality and quantity of marks" according to a police firearms examiner. Prosecutors said that Allen had admitted to the murders more than 60 times while incarcerated, confessing to "his wife, his mother, family members, the prison warden, the psychologist who treated him in prison, other prison employees and other inmates." The confessions were made in person, over the phone, and in writing. Prosecutors told the jury that Allen was the "Bridge Guy" after showing them a digitally enhanced 43-second version of the cellphone video recorded by German. A State Police Master Trooper, who had listened to more than 700 of Allen's prison phone calls, testified that "the voice of the 'Bridge Guy' is the voice of Richard Allen".

A clinical psychologist who worked for the Indiana Department of Corrections Behavioral Health testified on behalf of the defense that Allen was "diagnosed with a serious mental illness" and that he had a "grave disability". She testified that Allen told her that he had "originally planned to sexually assault the victims but ran away when he saw a van nearby, and he had cut the girls' throats and covered their bodies with sticks." The defense hired a neuropsychologist from Carmel, Indiana who testified at trial that Allen had "pretty severe depression" and work-related stress and anxiety.

The jury, which had been sequestered during the trial, began deliberations on November 7. On November 11, 2024, Allen was convicted on all counts. On December 20, 2024, Judge Gull sentenced Allen to 65 years for the murder of German and 65 years for the murder of Williams, with the terms to be served consecutively, resulting in a total of 130 years in prison. Allen was then transported to Westville Correctional Facility, and later the Pendleton Correctional Facility.

On July 18, 2025, Allen was transferred out of Indiana to the Lexington Assessment and Reception Center in Lexington, Oklahoma. According to the Oklahoma Department of Corrections, authorities responded to WTHR-TV, explaining that the state had an interstate compact agreement with Indiana since 2017, and has the same agreement with several other states.

== Later developments ==
On April 9, 2025, the videos of Allen's Indiana State Police interrogation and prison confession, which had been played during his trial, were released to the public. In one of the videos, Allen is seen denying the murders the day of his arrest. Another video features eight phone conversations between Allen, his wife, and his mother, where he is heard confessing to the murders.

On September 21, 2026, the Indiana Court of Appeals heard an appeal of Allen's murder convictions. Allen alleged that his confessions had been false and should not have been shown to the jury, claiming he had suffered a mental breakdown while in solitary confinement and had become convinced that he committed the murders. In response, lawyers for the state argued that he had made several incriminating statements before his psychological breakdown, and had continued to do so after his condition improved. Allen's lawyers also argued that the trial judge had wrongly barred them from calling an expert witness who would have testified that the murders "appeared to be a ritual sacrifice by people who worshipped Odin, the king of the gods in Norse mythology", and from questioning whether it was possible to conclusively link the bullet found at the crime scene to his gun.

== Memorials ==
In response to a request from German's mother in 2017, homeowners across central Indiana installed orange lights on their front porches, to commemorate the girls as well as to indicate that the murderer remained at large at that time.

In August 2017, the families announced their plans to build a sports complex for Delphi in memory of the girls. A non-profit organization, L & A Park Foundation, was formed to "celebrate and commemorate the lives of Libby German and Abby Williams by creating a place for the appreciation of nature, art, play, and athleticism for generations to come." A site was procured a mile north of Delphi, and in the years following the girls' deaths, continued progress has been made in the development of Abby and Libby Memorial Park. In 2020, the L & A Park Foundation was named a recipient of the NBA All-Star 2021 Legacy Grant.

The Delphi Community Middle School, which both girls attended at the time of their murders, renamed the school's library to the "Abby and Libby Memorial Library".

== See also ==
- List of murdered American children
- List of solved missing person cases (2010s)
- Murder of April Tinsley
- Deaths of Kris Kremers and Lisanne Froon
