= Deaths of Kris Kremers and Lisanne Froon =

2014 deaths of Dutch students in Panama

Coordinates: 8°46′48″N 82°26′24″W

- Kremers (left) and Froon (right)
- Born: Kremers: 9 August 1992; Froon: 24 September 1991; Amersfoort, Province of Utrecht, Netherlands
- Disappeared: 1 April 2014; Boquete, Chiriquí, Panama
- Status: Deceased (human remains found)
- Height: Kremers: 1.67 m (5 ft 6 in); Froon: 1.84 m (6 ft 0 in)

Kris Kremers and Lisanne Froon (Dutch pronunciation: [krɪs ˈkreːmərs] and [liˈzɑnə ˈfroːn]) were two Dutch students who disappeared on 1 April 2014 while hiking a trail called El Pianista in Panama. After an extensive search, portions of their bodies were found a few months later. Their cause of death could not be definitively determined. Dutch authorities working with forensic and search-rescue investigators initially thought it likely the students had accidentally fallen from a cliff after becoming lost. The circumstances and aftermath of their disappearance have resulted in much speculation about their final days.

Although many theories have been presented as to what happened to Kremers and Froon, no official cause of death has been ruled. Panamanian authorities came under fire for allegedly mishandling the disappearance and aftermath.

== Background ==
Kris Kremers (age 21) and Lisanne Froon (age 22) both grew up in Amersfoort, Province of Utrecht, in the Netherlands. Kremers was described as an open, creative, and responsible individual, while Froon was described as aspiring, optimistic, intelligent, and a passionate volleyball player. Kremers had just completed her studies in cultural social education, specializing in art education at the University of Utrecht. Froon had graduated with a degree in applied psychology from Deventer.

Only a few weeks prior to leaving for Panama, Froon had moved in with Kremers in a dorm room in Amersfoort, and they worked together at the café/restaurant called In den Kleinen Hap. They both saved up money for six months and planned to go to Panama together on a special holiday, hoping to learn Spanish and to do something of significance for the locals, particularly volunteering with children. The trip was supposed to be a graduation present for Froon.

== Disappearance ==
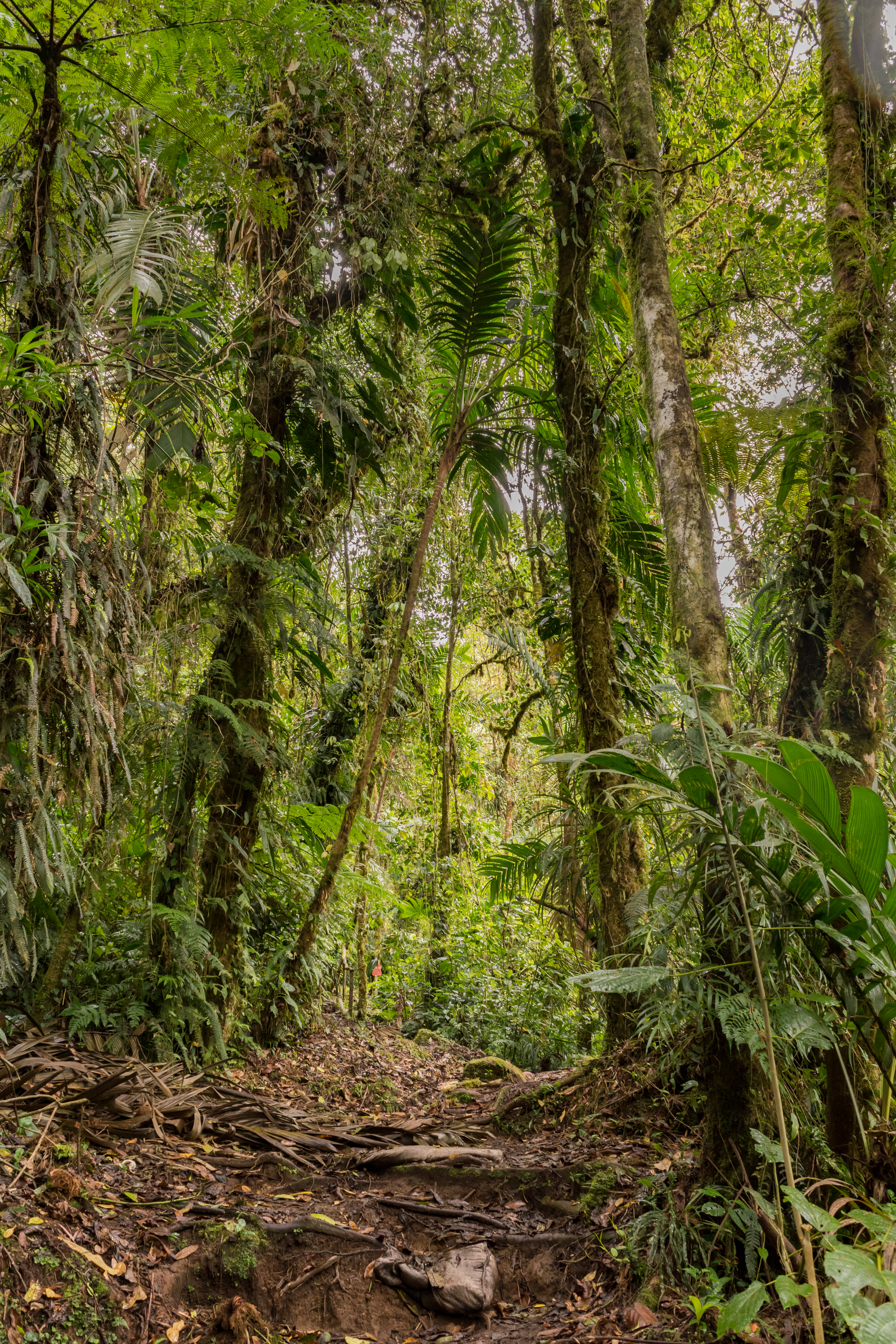
Jungle near Boquete

Approximate location of the disappearance

Kremers and Froon arrived in Panama on 15 March 2014. They toured the country for two weeks before arriving in Boquete, Chiriquí, on 29 March to live with a local family for a month while volunteering with children. On 1 April around 11 am, they went hiking near the clouded forests that surround the Baru volcano, following the El Pianista trail close to Boquete. Some sources say they took with them a dog that belonged to the owners of the Il Pianista restaurant. The women wrote on Facebook that they intended to walk around Boquete, and it was reported that they had been seen having brunch with two young Dutch men before embarking on the trail.

On the morning of 2 April, the women missed an appointment with a local guide. On 6 April, their parents arrived in Panama along with police, dog units, and detectives from the Netherlands to conduct a full-scale search of the forests for 10 days. The parents offered a US$30,000 reward for any information leading to the whereabouts of Kremers and Froon.

== Discovery of backpack ==
Around six hours into the hike, both of their cell phones were used to dial emergency services at 112 and 9-1-1. The first distress call attempt was made by Kremers' iPhone 4 at 16:39 (4:39 pm); shortly after that, another attempt was made from Froon's Samsung Galaxy S III at 16:51 (4:51 pm). None of the calls got through due to lack of reception in the area.

On 4 April, Froon's phone battery became exhausted after 05:00 and the phone was never used again. Kremers' iPhone would not make any more calls but was intermittently turned on, presumably to search for reception. Between 5 and 11 April, the iPhone was turned on multiple times but without ever entering the correct PIN code again (either no PIN or a wrong PIN was entered). On 11 April, the phone was turned on at 10:51 (10:51 am) and was turned off for the last time at 11:56 (11:56 am).

On 8 April, 90 flash photos were taken between 19:00 and 22:00 by using the digital camera, apparently deep in the jungle and in near-complete darkness. A few photos show that they were possibly near a river or a ravine. Some show a twig with plastic bags on top of a rock; another shows what looks like a backpack strap and a mirror on another rock, and another shows the back of Kremers' head.

Ten weeks later, on 14 June, a local woman turned in Froon's blue backpack, which she reported finding by a riverbank, near her village of Alto Romero, in the Bocas del Toro Province. The backpack contained two pairs of sunglasses, US$88 in cash, Froon's insurance card, a water bottle, Froon's Canon Powershot SX270 digital camera, two bras, and the women's phones – all in good condition.

== Discovery of remains ==
The discovery of the backpack led to new searches along the Culubre River. Kremers' denim shorts were found atop a rock on the opposite bank of the tributary, a few kilometres away from where Froon's backpack had been discovered. Two months later, closer to where the backpack was discovered, a pelvis and a boot with a foot inside were found. Soon, at least 33 widely scattered bones were discovered along the same river bank. DNA testing confirmed they belonged to Kremers and Froon. In total, only around 10% of Froon's and 5% of Kremers' bones were found.

A Panamanian forensic anthropologist later claimed that under magnification "there are no discernible scratches of any kind on the bones, neither of natural nor cultural origin – there are no marks on the bones at all", which made it unlikely that scavenging animals had scattered the remains.

Forensic pathologist Frank van der Goot, leader of a research team investigating the deaths with the Kremers family, was quoted in Dutch media as believing violence or foul play was implausible, and the most likely explanation was Kremers and Froon became lost or disoriented while hiking and fell from one of the many cliffs in the area.

== In media ==
- Still Lost in Panama by Christian Hardinghaus & Annette Nenner (2024) ISBN 979-8884161399

== See also ==
- Killing of Julie Ward
- List of unsolved deaths
- Murders of Louisa Vesterager Jespersen and Maren Ueland
- Murders of Abigail Williams and Liberty German
