= Pendleton, Indiana =

- Town
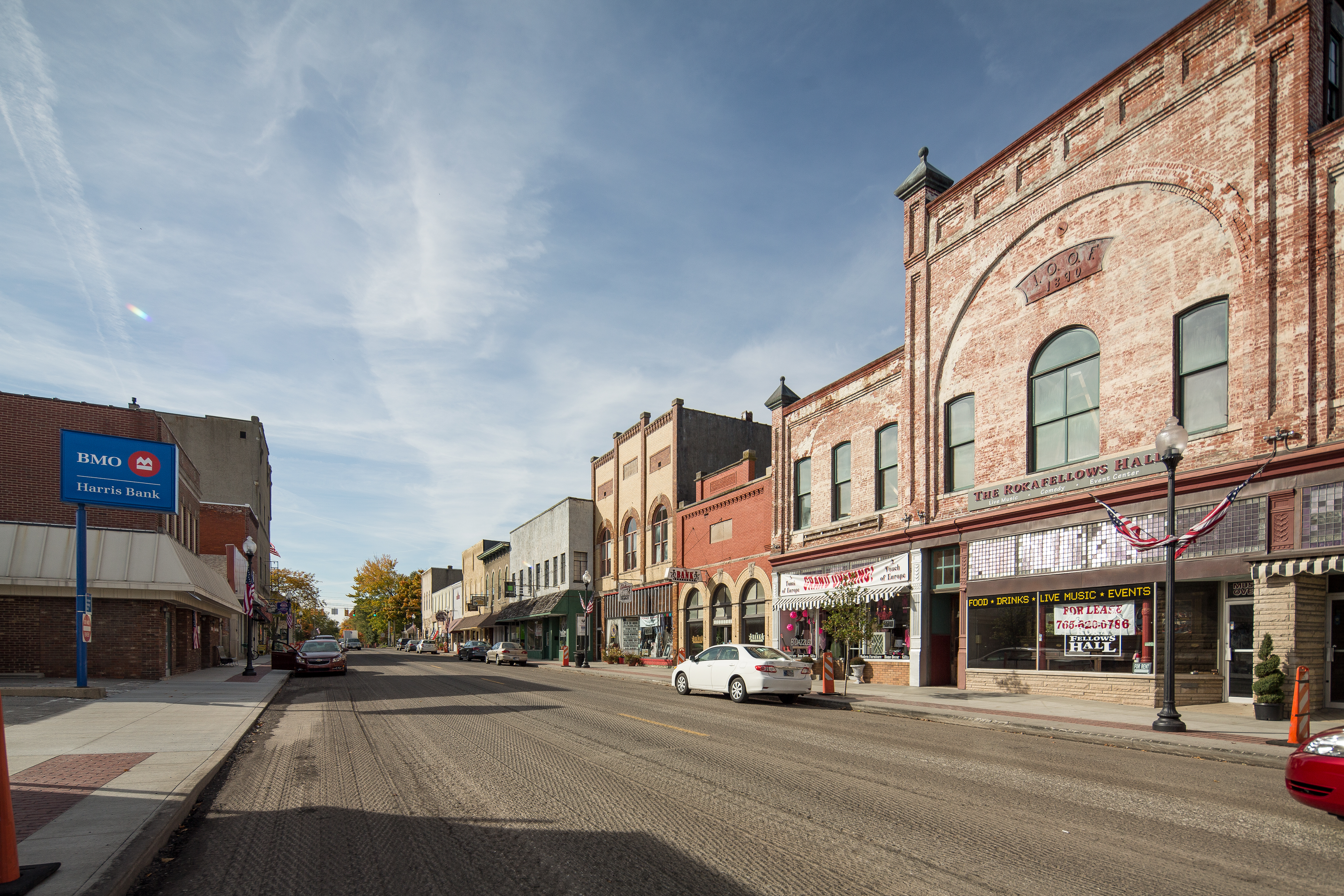
- Downtown Pendleton

- Logo
- Motto: "Strong roots empower healthy growth."
- Location in Madison County, Indiana
- Coordinates: 40°00′10″N 85°45′48″W
- Country: United States
- State: Indiana
- County: Madison
- Township: Fall Creek
- Platted: 1830

Government
  - Type: Town council

Area
  - Total: 13.43 sq mi (34.79 km^{2})
  - Land: 13.36 sq mi (34.61 km^{2})
  - Water: 0.069 sq mi (0.18 km^{2})
- Elevation: 876 ft (267 m)

Population (2020)
  - Total: 4,717
  - Estimate (2025): 6,535 ▲
  - Density: 353.0/sq mi (136.29/km^{2})
- Time zone: UTC-5 (Eastern (EST))
  - Summer (DST): UTC-4 (EDT)
- ZIP code: 46064
- Area code: 765
- FIPS code: 18-58662
- GNIS feature ID: 2396852
- Website: www.pendleton.in.gov

Pendleton is a town in Fall Creek Township, Madison County, Indiana, United States. The population was 5,930 in 2025 census, up from 4,728 in 2020.

== History ==
Pendleton was platted in 1830, and incorporated as a town in 1854. It was named for town founder Thomas Pendleton.

=== Fall Creek Massacre ===
The Fall Creek Massacre is the name given to the brutal murders of a peaceful group of Seneca and Miami Indians by white settlers. The massacre occurred on March 22, 1824, in Madison County between Fall Creek and Deer Lick Creek. James Hudson's trial was held October 7–9, 1824. Trials of the other men were held in 1825. The trial set an important precedent in recognizing the civil rights of Native Americans. The three men were hanged for their crimes in Pendleton. This marked the first time white men were executed for the murder of Native Americans in the United States. A historical marker in Falls Park marks the place of the hanging. The inscription reads: "Three white men were hung here in 1825 for killing Indians."

=== Attack on Frederick Douglass ===
Frederick Douglass wrote of being attacked by a mob as he promoted the Abolition cause in 1843. His party had erected a platform in nearby woods. A crowd of "rough characters", largely from "Andersonville", tried to silence them, then severely beat them. He defended himself with a stick, but was knocked unconscious. He was nursed back to health over days by the Quaker Neal Hardy and his wife. Douglass never regained full use of his injured hand.

=== 2019 tornado ===
Pendleton was struck by a strong tornado during the evening of May 27, 2019, during a major tornado outbreak. Moderate damage was reported to the town, with search and rescue efforts beginning that night. The tornado received a rating of high-end EF-2, with winds of 130 miles per hour (210 km/h).

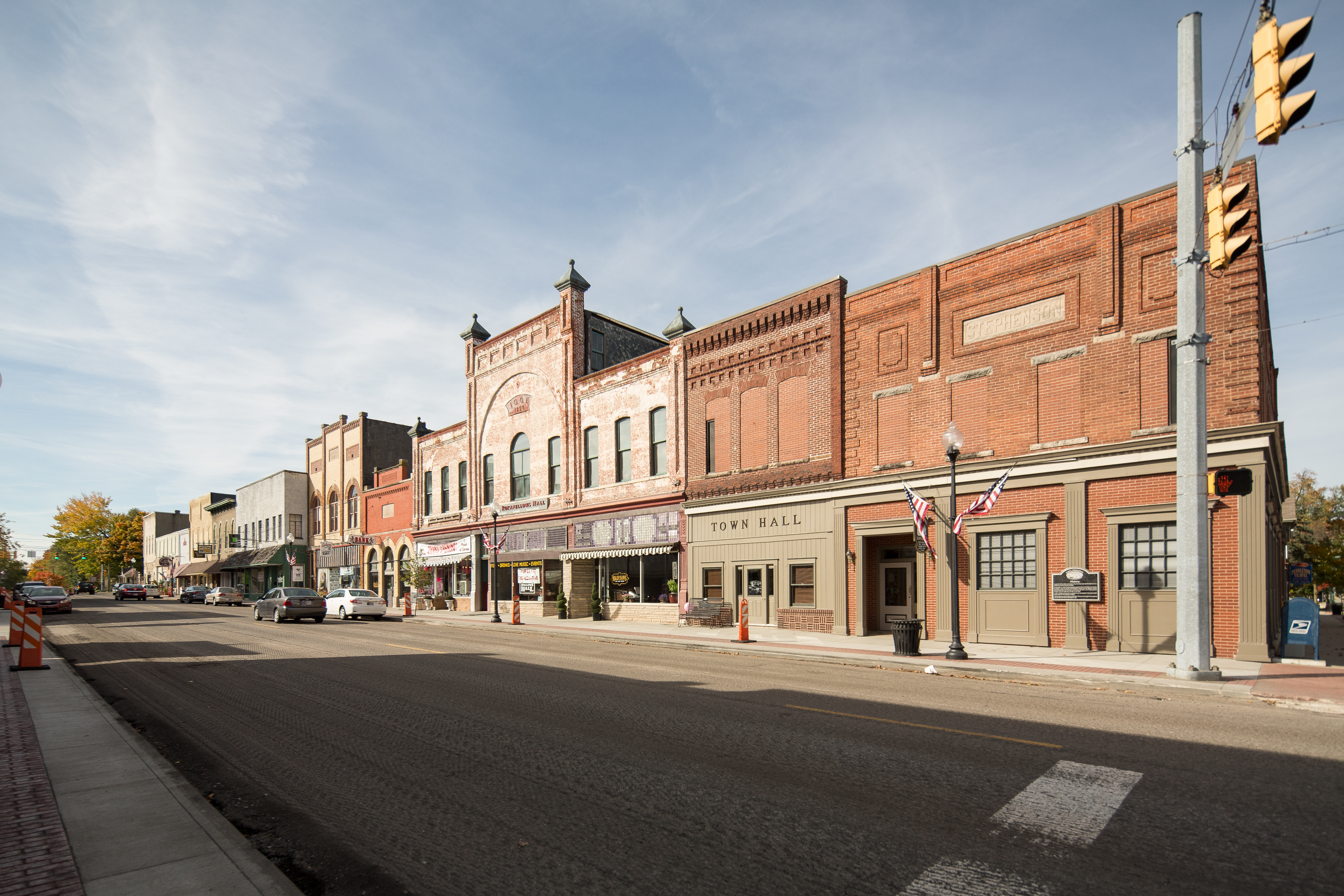
Photo from Small Town Indiana survey

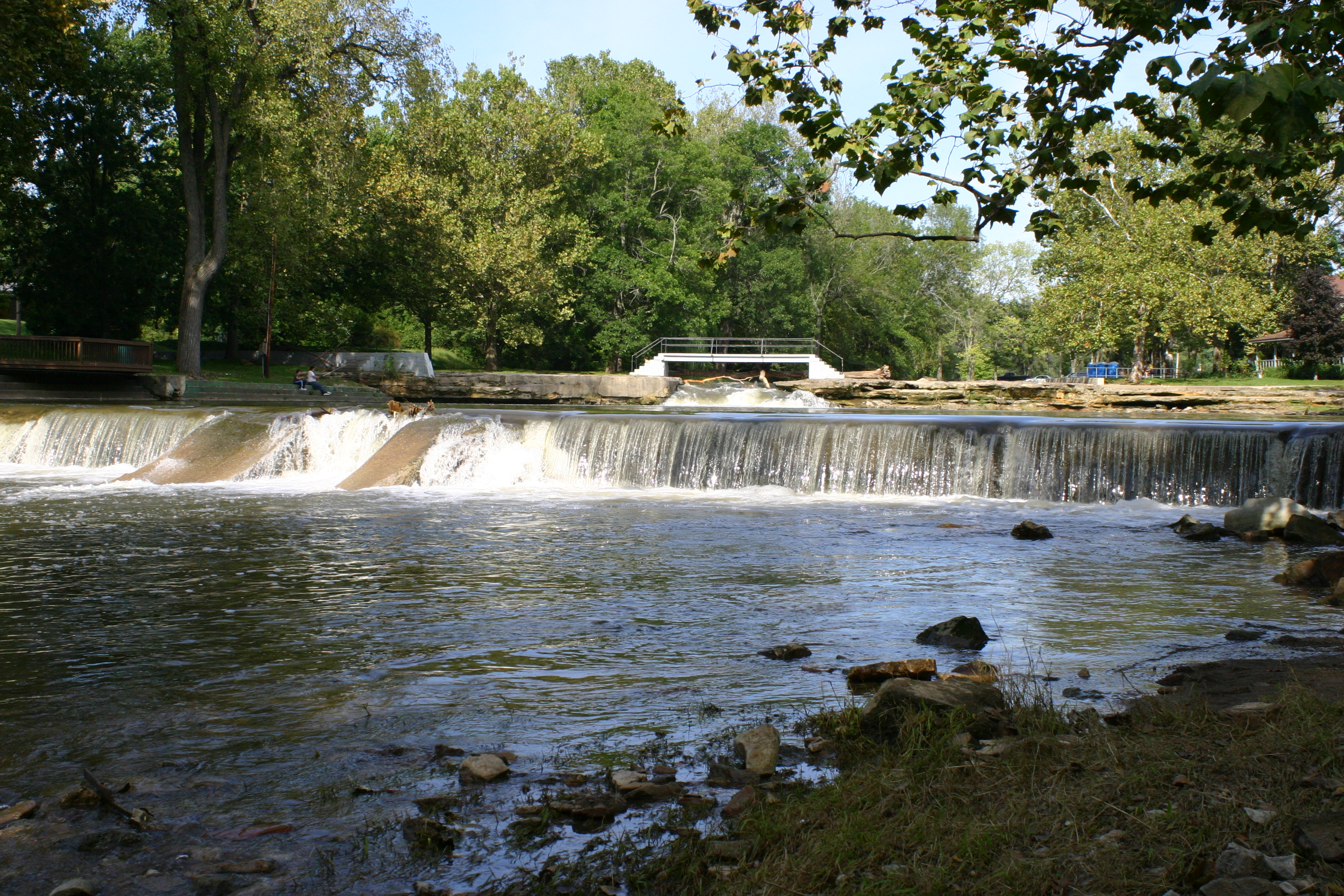
Falls Park

== Geography ==
Pendleton is located in southern Madison County. It is bordered to the north by the city of Anderson, the county seat. It is bordered to the west by the town of Lapel and to the southwest by the town of Ingalls.

Interstate 69 passes through the west side of the town and travels along its northern border, with access from Exits 219 and 222. I-69 leads southwest 30 miles (48 km) to Indianapolis and north-northeast 91 miles (146 km) to Fort Wayne. U.S. Route 36 passes through the southeast side of Pendleton, leading southwest to Indianapolis and east 62 miles (100 km) to Greenville, Ohio. Indiana State Road 9 passes through the east side of Pendleton, leading north 10 miles (16 km) to Anderson and south 15 miles (24 km) to Greenfield. State Road 38 passes through the center of Pendleton as State Street, leading east-southeast 21 miles (34 km) to New Castle and west-northwest 14 miles (23 km) to Noblesville. State Road 132 (Lapel Road) leads northwest from Pendleton 7 miles (11 km) to Lapel.

According to the U.S. Census Bureau, Pendleton has a total area of 13.43 square miles (34.78 km^{2}), of which 0.07 square miles (0.18 km^{2}), or 0.52%, are water. Fall Creek passes through the town west of its center, flowing southwest to the White River in Indianapolis.

== Demographics ==
Historical population
Census	Pop.	Note	%±
1850	389		—
1870	675		—
1880	614		−9.0%
1890	996		62.2%
1900	1,512		51.8%
1910	1,293		−14.5%
1920	1,244		−3.8%
1930	1,538		23.6%
1940	1,681		9.3%
1950	2,082		23.9%
1960	2,472		18.7%
1970	2,243		−9.3%
1980	2,130		−5.0%
1990	2,309		8.4%
2000	3,873		67.7%
2010	4,253		9.8%
2020	4,717		10.9%
2025 (est.)	6,535	▲	38.5%
US Decennial Census

Pendleton is part of the Indianapolis–Carmel–Anderson metropolitan statistical area.

=== 2020 census ===
As of the 2020 census, Pendleton had a population of 4,717. The median age was 40.7 years. 23.5% of residents were under the age of 18 and 20.6% of residents were 65 years of age or older. For every 100 females there were 86.6 males, and for every 100 females age 18 and over there were 81.1 males age 18 and over.

75.2% of residents lived in urban areas, while 24.8% lived in rural areas.

There were 1,975 households in Pendleton, of which 31.0% had children under the age of 18 living in them. Of all households, 47.3% were married-couple households, 15.6% were households with a male householder and no spouse or partner present, and 30.5% were households with a female householder and no spouse or partner present. About 30.7% of all households were made up of individuals and 16.2% had someone living alone who was 65 years of age or older.

There were 2,135 housing units, of which 7.5% were vacant. The homeowner vacancy rate was 2.8% and the rental vacancy rate was 7.4%.

Racial composition as of the 2020 census
Race	Number	Percent
White	4,414	93.6%
Black or African American	44	0.9%
American Indian and Alaska Native	9	0.2%
Asian	41	0.9%
Native Hawaiian and Other Pacific Islander	4	0.1%
Some other race	22	0.5%
Two or more races	183	3.9%
Hispanic or Latino (of any race)	92	2.0%

=== 2010 census ===
As of the 2010 United States census, there were 4,253 people, 1,754 households, and 1,154 families in the town. The population density was 380.8 inhabitants per square mile (147.0/km^{2}). There were 1,893 housing units at an average density of 169.5 per square mile (65.4/km^{2}). The racial makeup of the town was 96.6% White, 1.0% African American, 0.3% Native American, 0.8% Asian, 0.1% Pacific Islander, 0.3% from other races, and 0.9% from two or more races. Hispanic or Latino of any race were 1.0% of the population.

There were 1,754 households, of which 34.9% had children under the age of 18 living with them, 47.4% were married couples living together, 13.7% had a female householder with no husband present, 4.7% had a male householder with no wife present, and 34.2% were non-families. 30.4% of all households were made up of individuals, and 12.8% had someone living alone who was 65 years of age or older. The average household size was 2.37 and the average family size was 2.94.

The median age in the town was 37.6 years. 26.4% of residents were under the age of 18; 6.7% were between the ages of 18 and 24; 27.4% were from 25 to 44; 24.5% were from 45 to 64; and 15% were 65 years of age or older. The gender makeup of the town was 47.3% male and 52.7% female.

=== 2000 census ===
As of the 2000 United States census, there were 3,873 people, 1,550 households, and 1,052 families in the town. The population density was 577.6 inhabitants per square mile (223.0/km^{2}). There were 1,631 housing units at an average density of 243.2 per square mile (93.9/km^{2}). The racial makeup of the town was 98.27% White, 0.39% African American, 0.10% Native American, 0.46% Asian, 0.21% from other races, and 0.57% from two or more races. Hispanic or Latino of any race were 0.52% of the population.

There were 1,550 households, out of which 34.6% had children under the age of 18 living with them, 53.3% were married couples living together, 10.8% had a female householder with no husband present, and 32.1% were non-families. 27.9% of all households were made up of individuals, and 11.6% had someone living alone who was 65 years of age or older. The average household size was 2.41 and the average family size was 2.94.

The town population contained 25.7% under the age of 18, 7.2% from 18 to 24, 29.9% from 25 to 44, 21.3% from 45 to 64, and 15.9% who were 65 years of age or older. The median age was 36 years. For every 100 females, there were 88.1 males. For every 100 females age 18 and over, there were 84.0 males.

The median income for a household in the town was $46,204, and the median income for a family was $54,556. Males had a median income of $39,545 versus $25,753 for females. The per capita income for the town was $20,074. About 3.7% of families and 4.1% of the population were below the poverty line, including 5.7% of those under age 18 and none of those age 65 or over.

== Arts and culture ==
=== Museums and other points of interest ===
The Pendleton Historic District covers an area roughly bounded by Fall Creek, the Conrail right-of-way, and Madison and Adams streets. It is listed on the National Register of Historic Places along with Madison County Bridge No. 149.

== Education ==
It is in the South Madison Community School Corporation. The town houses the schools for that school district. The district has three elementary schools: Pendleton Elementary (formerly South Elementary), East Elementary and Maple Ridge Elementary. Pendleton Heights High School sits atop a hill on the edge of the east side of town and serves as the local high school. A newly constructed Pendleton Heights Middle School opened in August 2009 across from the high school. The former middle school, located in the downtown area just north of Pendleton Elementary, now serves as Pendleton Elementary School - Intermediate.

The town has a lending library, the Pendleton Community Public Library.

=== Newspaper ===
The Times-Post is a weekly newspaper serving Pendleton and the surrounding communities. The paper was formerly known as The Pendleton Times, and was the first to feature Jim Davis' original comic strip "Gnorm Gnat" and "Jon", a prototype of Garfield.

=== Radio ===
WEEM (91.7 FM) is a radio station located on the campus of Pendleton Heights High School and run by the students. It is a non-commercial, 1200 watt station that covers about 20 miles (32 km) and also supports a mobile application on both iOS and Google Play. The format of the station is contemporary rock. WEEM has been operational since 1970. WEEM competes in the annual IASB State Radio Contest.

== Transportation ==
Highways

- Major highways and roads that serve Pendleton include I-69, State Road 9, State Road 38, State Road 67, and U.S. Route 36.

=== Ambulance service ===
According to the Indiana EMS commission, Pendleton Emergency Ambulance operates one of only two volunteer Advanced Life Support (ALS) ambulance services in Indiana.

== Prisons ==
Three facilities of the Indiana Department of Corrections are in Fall Creek Township, near Pendleton

- Pendleton Correctional Facility
- Correctional Industrial Facility
- Pendleton Juvenile Correctional Facility

The Pendleton Correctional Facility is located on the south edge of town. Famous former inmates include: John Dillinger, Harry Pierpont, Jim "Goose" Ligon and Homer Van Meter. The Pendleton Reformatory is a maximum security prison and is located at 4490 Reformatory Rd.

== Notable people ==
- George Daugherty (1955– ), Emmy Award nominated director for the ABC television network
- Dick Dickey (1926–2006), played basketball at North Carolina State and played guard for the Boston Celtics
- Kellen Dunham (1993– ), professional basketball player at Butler University and for Okapi Aalstar.
- Don Hankins (1902–1963), Major League Baseball pitcher for the 1927 Detroit Tigers
- Joseph Swain (1857–1927), president of Indiana University and Swarthmore College.
- Walter Dorwin Teague (1883–1960), industrial designer and architect
- William Walker (1896–1992), actor as of Reverend Sykes in To Kill a Mockingbird in 1962.
- Fred Wilt (1920–1994), set the world record in the two mile at 8:51 in 1952.
