= Wabash Valley Correctional Facility =

Prison in Indiana, United States

Coordinates: 38°58′40″N 87°24′00″W

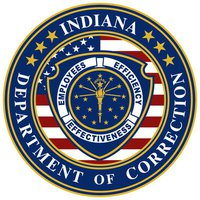
- Interactive map of Wabash Valley Correctional Facility
- Location: Haddon Township, Sullivan County, near Carlisle, Indiana
- Status: Operational
- Security class: Minimum to maximum
- Capacity: 2,125
- Population: 2,080 – Daily average
- Opened: December 11, 1992
- Director: Keith Vinardi, Warden

Wabash Valley Correctional Facility is a prison situated south of Terre Haute, located in Haddon Township, Sullivan County, just north of Carlisle, Indiana.

The Wabash Valley Correctional Facility received American Correctional Association (ACA) re-accreditation at the 145th Congress of Corrections August 2015 in Indianapolis, Indiana.

== Special Needs Unit (SNU) ==
The SNU is a mental health treatment unit designed to house Seriously Mentally Ill offenders who have been designated as needing intensive mental health treatment and programming within the Indiana Department of Correction. Offender participants may be transferred into the unit from any other facility in the state. When participants arrive, they are assessed and placed in the program's phase system. Phase three offenders attend all programming and meals within the unit, but do attend recreation in the gym. Phase four offenders additionally go outside of the unit for special programs and meals. Phase five offenders can attend programming outside the unit and attend meals and recreation with WVCF PLUS program participants.

== On television ==
- The facility has been shown on the MSNBC series Lockup: Extended Stay and Young Kids, Hard Time.

== Sources ==
1. "Carlisle prison doors open to smiling faces." Tribune-Star. 30 October 1992.
2. "Prison welcomes first 'residents'". Tribune-Star. 11 December 1992.
