= Indiana Boys School =

Correctional institution for adolescent boys

Coordinates: 39°41′24″N 86°24′50″W

The Indiana Boys' School (IBS) was opened in 1867 as a correctional institution for adolescent boys. It was located on U.S. Route 40 just outside Plainfield, Indiana. For 138 years, it was the primary correctional facility for juvenile males in Indiana, situated on 1,038 acres. For most of its existence, it was a self-sustained institution, providing vocational training to the inmates in many different occupations, including agriculture, electrical, cooking, tailoring, barbering and shop work. In October 2005, the grounds and building were transformed into a pre-release center for adult males, while the boys were transferred to a new facility located on the grounds of the Indianapolis Juvenile Correctional Facility (formerly the Indiana Girls School) in west Indianapolis. IBS was a state operated, medium to maximum-security facility with approximately 245 staff and 335 boys housed in campus style cottages.

== History ==
On January 11, 1867, Indiana Governor Oliver P. Morton appointed a commission to explore the possibility of creating a House of Refuge for delinquent boys. In April 1867, the first Board of Control was organized and visited houses of refuge in Chicago, Cincinnati and Lancaster, Ohio. The board used the Lancaster house as a model and selected a 225-acre (0.91 km^{2}) site west of Plainfield, Indiana, the following month.

In July 1867, construction of the first homes, a shop, a bakehouse and a milkhouse began on the grounds. The facility was designed to accommodate 100 boys until they were rehabilitated or reached the age of 21. In October, Francis B. Ainsworth was appointed first superintendent of the House of Refuge. Ainsworth had formerly been an official at the Reform School in Lancaster, Ohio, on which the new House of Refuge was modeled.

The first boy was received in January 1868; by years end, the House of Refuge had a population of 112 boys from all over Indiana. Most boys were members of gangs and petty thieves. Half of each day was spent in the classroom while the other half was spent working. All boys under 16 years were required to learn to read, write and perform simple arithmetic.

Between 1880 and 1888, fourteen new brick buildings were constructed on the grounds of IBS. The boys were charged with the task of not only constructing the new buildings, but also of making the bricks themselves. While the new buildings were under construction, IBS, already at a full capacity of 372 boys, was forced to refuse admission to 200 boys. As a result, in 1883, the Indiana General Assembly passed a bill renaming the institution the Indiana Reform School for Boys and establishing new requirements for entry.

In the 1890s, the disciplinary system at IBS was semi-military in nature, which can be attributed to the tenure of Colonel Thomas Charlton as superintendent. "The disciplining here is much as it is at West Point or Annapolis, except in this—that, instead of placing under arrest as is done with the worst offenders there, we use some corporal punishment," Charlton is reported to have said.

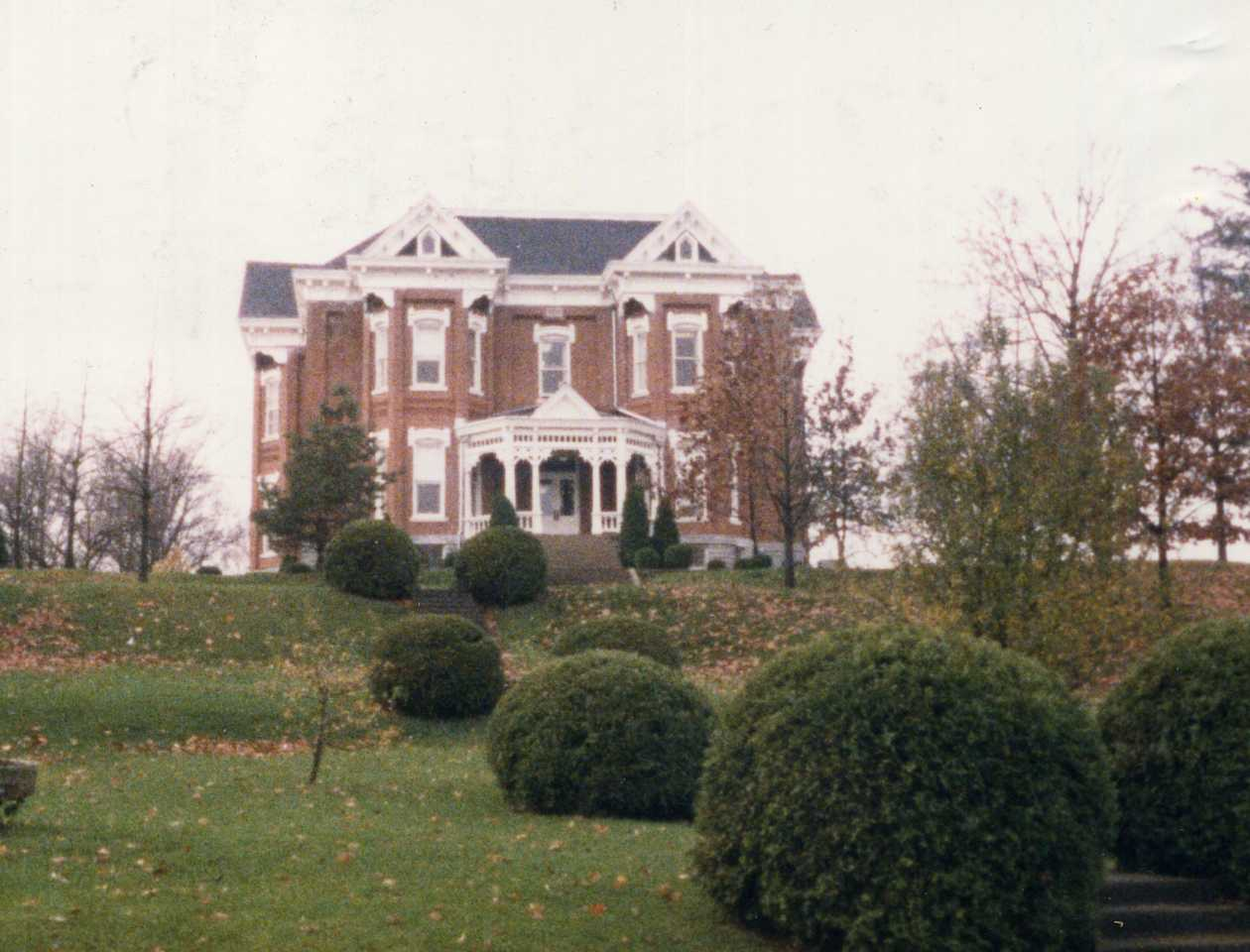
The Administrative Building at the Indiana Boys' School

Charlton during his tenure began training boys in nineteen different occupations: brick making, brick burning, brick laying, plastering, painting, glazing, gas and steam fitting, gas making, bread making, cooking, tailoring, shoe making, gardening and farming, caring for stock, floriculture, carpentry, laundry, printing, blacksmithing, and making music. "I am a believer in industrial work that tends to turn a boy's mind to the trades. In the work of reformation, I rely upon it more than upon anything else."

In 1900, the badge system was adopted to set release dates for boys. New boys were given a "badge level" depending on the severity of their crime. The boys could earn badges for good behavior and hard work. Under the system, it was possible for a boy to leave the school in one year.

In 1901, the institution's name was changed to Indiana Boys' School, a name it would keep for more than a century. Charlton retired after 20 years as superintendent of the school in that same year and was replaced by E. E. York, who continued the system Charlton had established.

After adding tenth grade in 1901 and eleventh grade in 1915, the academic school at IBS was recognized by the Department of Education and given a probationary rating in 1926.

The next 20 years at IBS were marked by constant change. The badge system was replaced by a merit system in 1928. Under the merit system, a student needed to accumulate 5,000 "points" in order to be paroled but was required to stay for at least one year. The merit system was itself replaced by a classification system in 1935. In 1936, the state purchased more land surrounding IBS, increasing its size to 1,308 acres (5.29 km^{2}).

IBS hosted movie crews in 1949 for the shooting of Johnny Holiday starring William Bendix, Hoagy Carmichael and Allen Martin Jr. The movie, directed by Willis Goldbeck, is the story of a young tough street boy who is sent to a boys' prison. The historic Administration Building, built in 1893, is featured in several scenes.

In 1970, the farm and dairy programs were closed and replaced by a vocational horticulture program. The following year, co-ed activities were added to the school agenda. Monthly activities with the Indiana Girls' School located about 9 miles (14 km) to the east were incorporated and included a co-ed newspaper called The Herald and Super-Star Spectrum. Other co-ed activities were group counseling, school and staff development.

In September 1971, the administration of IBS was reorganized to be more efficient. Part of those changes included the initiation of volunteer programs in cooperation with local churches. Some programs included were PACE (Program for All-inclusive Care of the Elderly), Rotarians, Optimists and Jaycees.

In June 1973, corporal punishment was halted at IBS following the U.S. District Court trial of a lawsuit filed by two former IBS inmates. One inmate who appeared at the trial said he "was paddled until he bled" and another claims to have been held in solitary confinement for 70 days.

== Changing nature of inmate population ==
The Boys' School's initial objective was to house up to 100 boys, until the boy was reformed or until they reached the age of 21. Most were gang members, till tappers and common thieves, but many were orphaned, neglected or homeless boys. By 1872, the school was deemed too crowded and 150 boys were refused admittance. After more buildings were built, the average population swelled to 543 by 1891.

IBS gradually began housing more and more violent offenders over the following decades. One memorable case in 1974 marked a drastic change in the types of boys at IBS. Fourteen-year-old Charles Murphy was convicted of committing three robberies and two rapes. Since Murphy was under eighteen, he was tried as a juvenile and the maximum sentence he could receive was detention at IBS until his twentieth birthday.

A report in 1975 by Superintendent Alfred Bennett estimated that one-third of the 400 boys at IBS committed rape, burglary or assault. As a result, IBS instituted a "strong treatment program" for violent offenders that provided psychiatric care.

== Violence at IBS ==
Four inmates beat custodian Cecil Gentry on September 29, 1968, inflicting a jaw fracture. Gentry was lured into a shower room in the facilities basement after the boys falsely reported a fight. The four boys promptly ran from the school, stole a car, and were apprehended in Indianapolis the following day.

On July 27, 1975, an inmate wielding the arm of a chair beat a guard during an escape attempt by ten boys that was later thwarted.

Sixteen-year-old Anthony Burse died mysteriously after a fight with another inmate in November 1985. Burse engaged in a fight with the inmate while leaving the dining hall. He was then restrained and placed into a padded detention cell. He was later found lying unconscious on the floor of the cell. Burse was pronounced dead at Wishard Hospital the following morning.

== Escape attempts and security concerns ==
In 1951, Charles Manson escaped from the facility along with two other boys. All three were later recaptured in Utah.

In November 1971, three boys successfully escaped from IBS by breaking a window in a game room and running from the grounds. The trio was apprehended several days later walking down a nearby street. Two other boys escaped by beating a guard, Lawrence Thompson, and stealing his car. Superintendent Alfred Bennett blamed the escapes on a lack of maximum-security facilities.

In January 1972, eight boys escaped after beating a guard. The group flagged down a passing motorist and forced him to drive them to Indianapolis. Six were apprehended the following day in Indianapolis, while the remaining two were caught in Hendricks County.

An outbreak of escape attempts in the early 1990s caused the facility to add a fence in late 1994. One particular escape in April 1993 caused the surrounding community to demand changes at IBS. Two teenage escapees attacked a Plainfield woman, Lauretta Robinson, in her home and severely beat her during their six-day run from the law. Robinson sued the state and the Boys' School, claiming negligence. In particular, the surrounding communities protested allowing boys to wear street clothes at IBS, which made it difficult to identify escapees.

== Notable inmates ==
- Ray Dempsey Gardner, future serial killer who served time at the Boys’ School for an unspecified crime
- Charles Manson was sentenced to the Boys' School in April, 1949, when he was 14 years old. He ran away that October, but was caught immediately. In 1951, he made a final and successful escape.
