= Education in Harlem =

Coordinates: 40°48′32.52″N 73°56′54.14″W

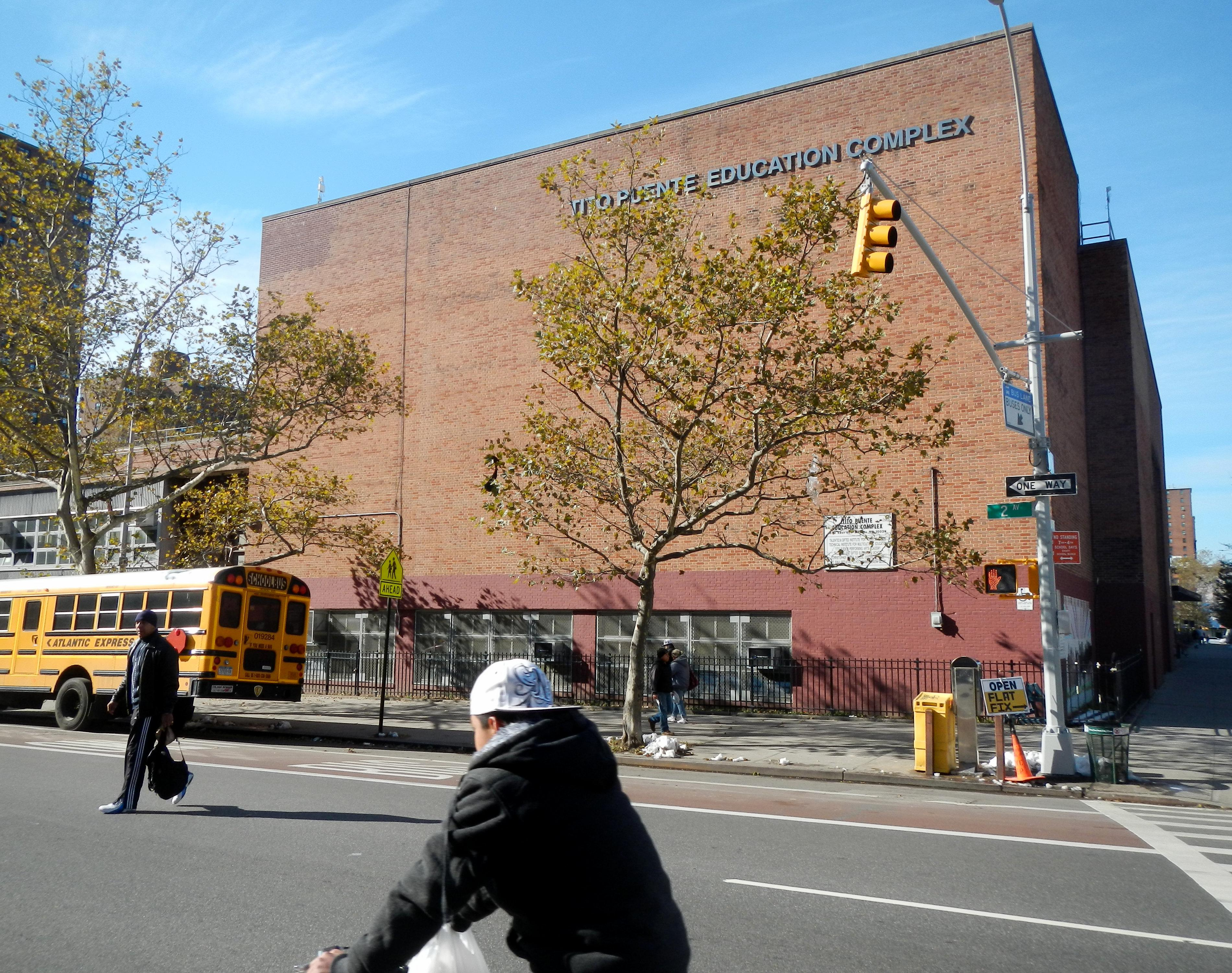
Tito Puente Educational Complex

Education in and around the neighborhood of Harlem, in Manhattan, New York City, is provided in schools and institutions of higher education, both public and private. For many decades, Harlem has had a lower quality of public education than wealthier sections of the city. It is mostly lower-income.

For purposes of this article, the modern boundaries of greater Harlem are considered to be West 110th Street, Fifth Avenue, East 96th Street, the East River, the Hudson River, and 155th Street, although some variation occurs with the southwestern boundary. This area includes both the neighborhood of Harlem itself, as well as the adjacent neighborhoods of East Harlem, Manhattanville, and Hamilton Heights.

== Community districts ==
New York City is divided into many Community School Districts (CSDs), although many functions formerly performed at the district level are now distributed elsewhere. Those districts with jurisdiction in parts of Harlem are Districts 2, 3, 4, 5, 6, and 75, with 2, 3, and 6 also serving other parts of Manhattan and 75 being a citywide district covering special education schools.

Some schools located outside of Harlem may have programs that take place in Harlem. An example is City-As-School, a public non charter high school headquartered in downtown Manhattan that supports education in conjunction with internships across the city, thus potentially including Harlem.

== History and quality of education ==
In the 1930s, overcrowding in schools in Harlem was identified as a major impediment to education and a subject for reform efforts. Lucile Spence, Gertrude Elise McDougald Ayer, and Layle Lane were educators involved in the reform efforts. "Opportunities to enter a racially mixed high school were minimal, and by 1913 fewer than two hundred Black high school students attended racially mixed high schools," Jeffrey Babcock Perry wrote in Hubert Harrison: The Voice of Harlem Radicalism in 2009.

By 1993, Harlem was predominately African-American with incomes below the current national median. Many residents, who lived in poverty and thus were subject to racism as well as classism, found education disadvantaged. In standardized English and math tests, Harlem schools posted the worst average scores. Not receiving Regents high school diplomas on time was more common in Harlem than in most other communities in the city by 2006. This excluded GEDs, special education diplomas, or alternative certificates, as well as children in the criminal justice system who were not counted.

District 3, which covers most of southwestern Harlem as well as the Upper West Side, did not have any gifted & talented education programs in the Harlem section of the district as of 2017, while on the Upper East Side, there are several gifted programs. The schools in the district are also highly segregated and are gradually losing enrollment to charter schools and better-performing schools elsewhere in the district. Most District 3 schools in Harlem are majority-black and Hispanic with decreasing enrollment over the years, while District 3 schools on the Upper West Side are mostly white with increasing enrollment. This is also true of Harlem schools in general. For example, PS 241 STEM Institute of Manhattan, a school on 113th Street near Adam Clayton Powell Jr. Boulevard, lost three-fourths of its enrollment in ten years, going from 582 students in 2007 to 125 students in 2016. Less than 25% of kindergarten students zoned to PS 241 actually attend that school. It was proposed to be closed in 2008–9 but the school was kept open due to opposition from a teachers' union. An October 2016 proposal to merge PS 241 with nearby PS 76 was poorly received by parents from the latter school, so the 2016 merger was also canceled. By contrast, further south in district 3, 89% of kindergartners zoned to PS 87 on West 78th Street are enrolled in that school.

Principals of Harlem public schools give different reasons for low enrollment. Some said that their schools had not been advertised enough, while others stated that charter schools promoted their own enrollment at the expense of public schools. As of 2017, two Harlem schools, PS 180 and PS 185, had seen increases in enrollment in the preceding years.

Of the nine charter schools in District 3 as of 2017, eight are in Harlem. Many black and Hispanic families in Harlem send their kids to charter or private schools, or to better-performing public schools elsewhere in the district. The public non charter schools in Harlem have been criticized for decades as being educationally among the worst in the city. By contrast, the charters in Harlem have been praised for their quality of education, even when compared to charters elsewhere in the nation. Charters have been criticized on other grounds, but not uniquely to Harlem, except for objections to there being so many charters in Harlem competing with public non charter schools for classroom space. Transfers of teachers involuntarily into Harlem in the 1960s, by sending the teachers to schools with difficult students, were reputedly intended by the City's Board of Education to drive unwanted teachers out of the profession altogether.

Columbia University has periodically planned physical expansion, competing for space with residents, and seeking coordination with New York State for the application of eminent domain on the ground of blight.

== Elementary through high school ==
This covers pre-kindergarten through twelfth grade.

=== Public schools ===
Publicly funded schools include non charter and charter schools, generally not charging tuition, and getting their funds primarily from state and city governments.

==== Non charter schools ====
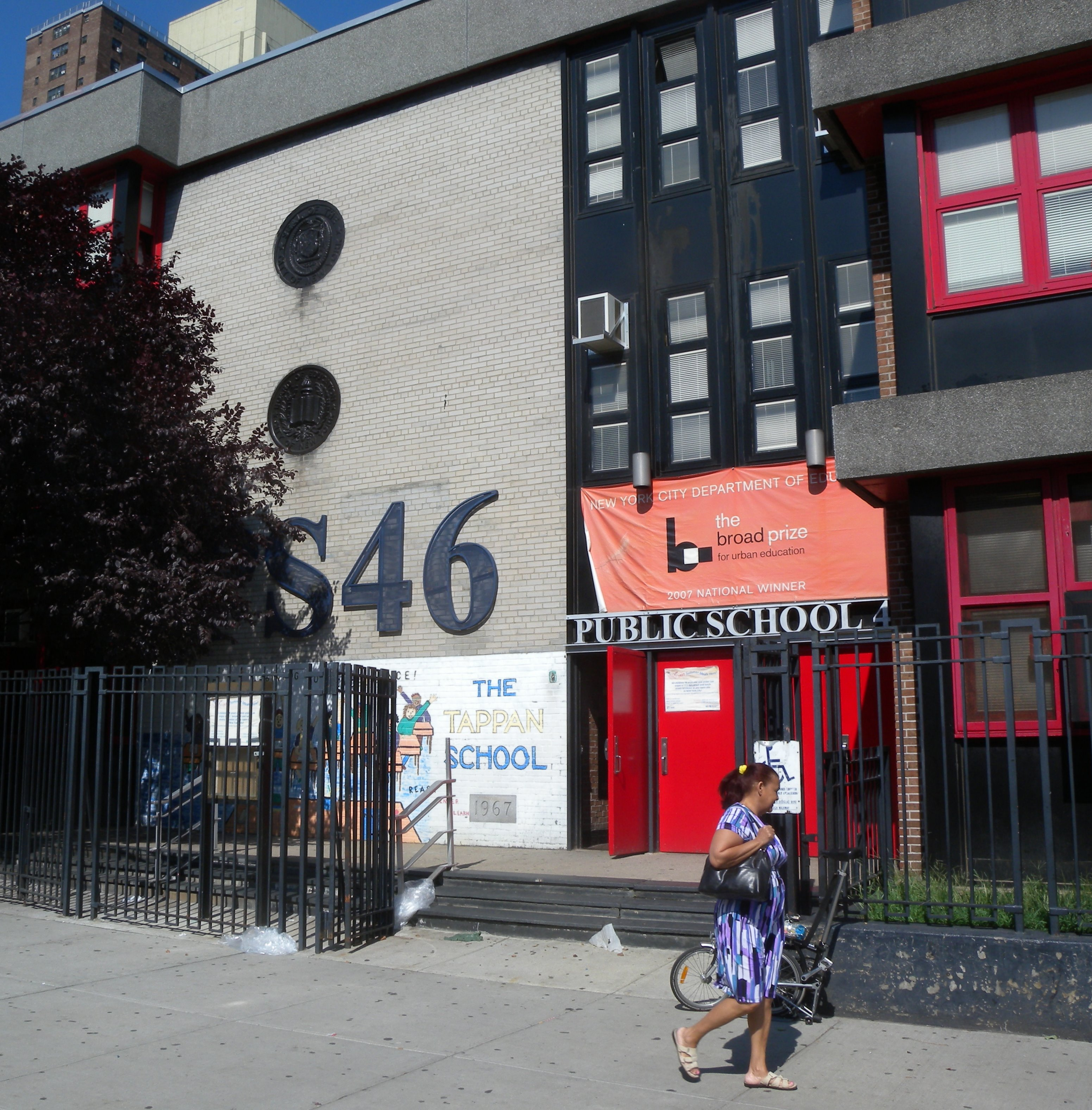
PS 46

The New York City Department of Education runs public non charter schools in Harlem and provides a locator service for finding them. These include:

- Central Park East
- Manhattan Center for Science and Mathematics, a high school, 280 Pleasant Av.
- Park East High School
- Young Women's Leadership School of East Harlem, 105 E. 106th Street.
- The Ralph Bunche School 425 W 123rd St, New York, NY 10027
- P.S. 149 Sojourner Truth 21 W 111th St, New York, NY 10026
- John H. Finley Campus School, PS/MS 129M 425 W 130th St, New York, NY 10027

==== Charter schools ====
Charter schools are authorized by any of three authorizing agencies and operate under fewer rules than do non charter schools, and often have higher expectations for students. In Harlem, many charters outperform non charter schools, doing a better job of educating students in math and English as measured by state examinations. Charters are generally free of tuition to attend. When a charter school receives more qualified applicants than it has classroom space to admit, it usually runs a lottery and places everyone who is not admitted that way onto a waitlist for possible openings later in the year. Schools offer classes in various grades and some add a grade each year, so that a student, once started, can continue studying in the same school.

In Harlem, about 20 percent of children who are eligible by age are enrolled in charters, and that does not count applicants who are denied admission because of lack of room.

Charter schools in Harlem include:

- Amber Charter School, grades K–5, 220 E. 106th St., in Community School District 4; school chartered by State Univ. of N.Y. (SUNY):
- http://democracyprep.org/schools
- Grades 6–9, 207 W. 133rd St., in Community School District 5; school chartered by N.Y.C. Dep't of Educ.
- Dream Charter School, grades K–2, 232 E. 103rd St., in Community School District 4; school chartered by N.Y.C. Dep't of Educ.
- Future Leaders Institute Charter School, grades K–8, 134 W. 122nd St., in Community School District 3; school chartered by N.Y.C. Dep't of Educ.
- Harbor Science and Arts Charter School, grades 1–8, 1 E. 104th St., in Community School District 4; school chartered by State Univ. of N.Y. (SUNY)
- Harlem Children's Zone:
  - Harlem Children's Zone/Promise Academy I Charter School, grades K–6 & 9–10, 35 E. 125th St., in Community School District 5; school chartered by N.Y.C. Dep't of Educ.
  - Harlem Children's Zone/Promise Academy II, grades K–5, 2005 Madison Av., in Community School District 5; school chartered by N.Y.C. Dep't of Educ.
- Harlem Day Charter School, grades K–5, 240 E. 123rd St., in Community School District 4; school chartered by State Univ. of N.Y. (SUNY)
- Harlem Link Charter School, grades K–5, 20 W. 112th St., in Community School District 3; school chartered by State Univ. of N.Y. (SUNY)
- Harlem Village Academies:
  - Harlem Village Academy Charter School, grades 5–11, 244 W. 144th St., in Community School District 5; school chartered by State Univ. of N.Y. (SUNY)
  - Harlem Village Academy Leadership Charter School, grades 5–9, 2351 1st Av., in Community School District 4; school chartered by State Univ. of N.Y. (SUNY)
- Knowledge Is Power Program
  - Kipp Infinity Charter School, grades K & 5–9, 625 W. 133rd St., in Community School District 5; school chartered by N.Y.C. Dep't of Educ.
  - KIPP S.T.A.R. College Preparatory, grades 5–9, 425 W. 123rd St., in Community School District 5; school chartered by State Univ. of N.Y. (SUNY)
- New Heights Academy Charter School, grades 5–12, 1818 Amsterdam Av., in Community School District 6; school chartered by N.Y.C. Dep't of Educ.
- New York City Center for Autism Charter School, grades 1–6 & 8, 433 E. 100th St., in Community School District 4; school chartered by N.Y.C. Dep't of Educ.
- The Opportunity Charter School, grades 6–12, 240 W. 113th St., in Community School District; school chartered by N.Y.C. Dep't of Educ.:
- Renaissance Charter High School for Innovation, 410 E 100th St.
- The Sisulu-Walker Charter School of Harlem, grades K–5, 125 W. 115th St., in Community School District 3; school chartered by State Univ. of N.Y. (SUNY)
- St. HOPE Leadership Academy Charter School, grades 5–8, 222 W. 134th St., in Community School District 5; school chartered by N.Y.C. Dep't of Educ.

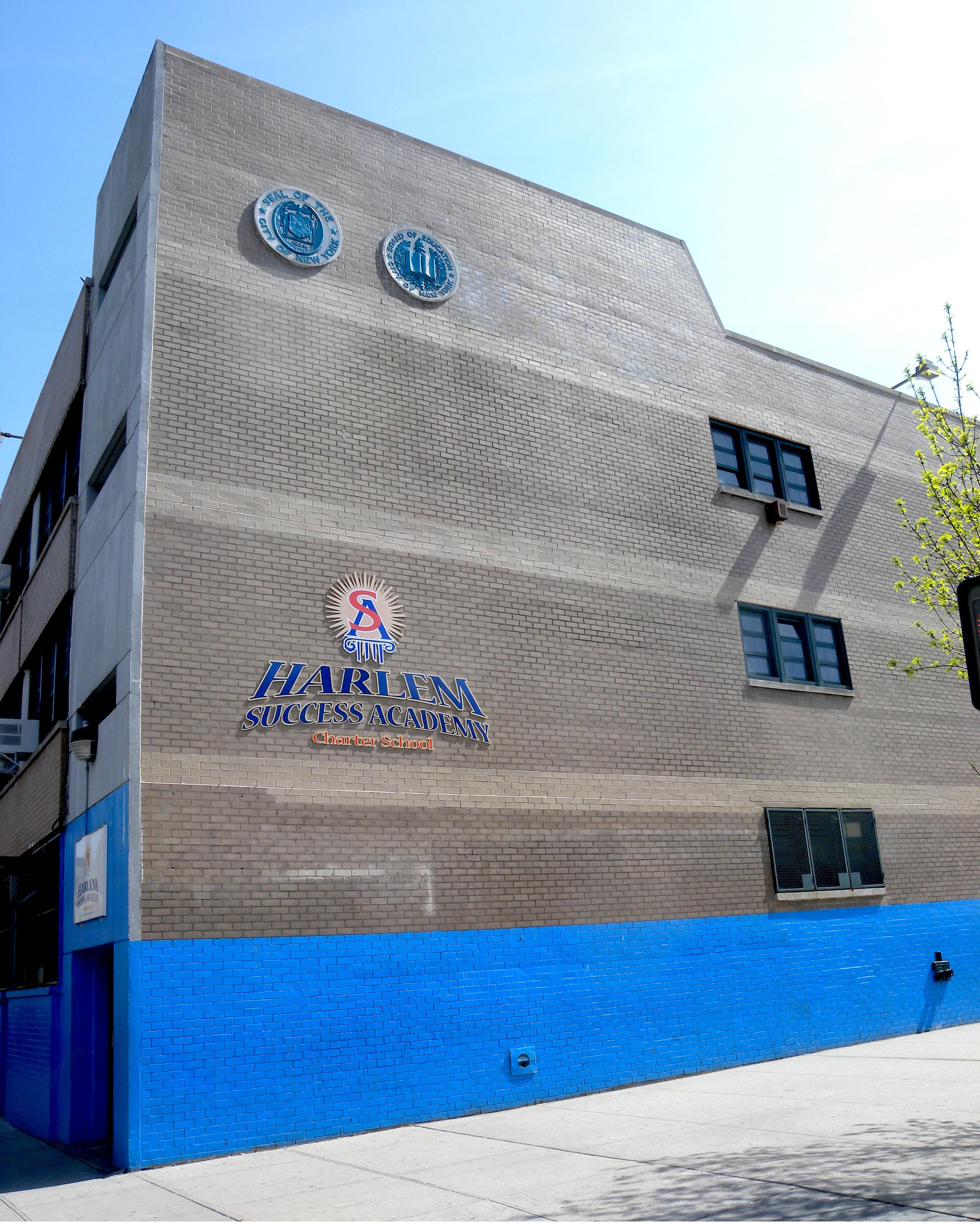
Schoolhouse of Success Academy Harlem 1

- Success Academy Charter Schools:
  - Success Academy Harlem 1, grades K–6, 34 W. 118th St., in Community School District 3; school chartered by State Univ. of N.Y. (SUNY):
  - Success Academy Harlem 2, grades K–4, 144-176 E. 128th Street., in Community School District 5; school chartered by State Univ. of N.Y. (SUNY)
  - Success Academy Harlem 3, grades K–4, 410 E. 100th St., in Community School District 4; school chartered by State Univ. of N.Y. (SUNY)
  - Success Academy Harlem 4, grades K–4, 240 W. 113th St., in Community School District 3; school chartered by State Univ. of N.Y. (SUNY)
  - Success Academy Harlem 5, grades K-4, 301 W. 140 Street, in Community School District 5
  - Success Academy Harlem 6, grades K-3, 461 W. 131st Street, in Community School District 5
  - Success Academy Harlem North Central, grades 5–8, 175 W. 134th Street, in Community District 5
  - Success Academy Harlem West, grades 5–8, 215 W. 114th Street, in Community School District 3
  - Success Academy Harlem East, grades 5–8, 141 E. 111th Street
  - The Success Academy Charter Schools group has expanded rapidly in Harlem, opening several new schools in the past few years in order to increase student enrollment across its Harlem portfolio.

=== Private schools ===
Private schools generally charge tuition to attend.

==== Parochial schools ====
Parochial schools are generally run by religious institutions. Some include:

- The Cathedral School of St. John the Divine, grades K–8, Episcopal, 1047 Amsterdam Av.
- Cristo Rey New York High School, grades 9–12, 112 E. 106th St., Catholic;
- St. Hilda's & St. Hugh's School, toddlers-8th grade, Episcopal, 619 W. 114th St.
- St. Charles Borromeo School, Grades PK3-8, Catholic, 214 W. 142 St.
- St. Ann, The Personal School, Grades PreK3 - 8, Catholic, 314 East 110th St.

==== Non parochial schools ====
Some private schools are not run by religious institutions. Some include:

- Bank Street School for Children, nursery (about age 3)–grade 8, 610 W. 112th St.
- The Children's Storefront, preschool–grade 4, 70 E. 129th St.
- Harlem Academy, grades 1–8, 1330 5th Av.
- Manhattan Country School, grades pre-K–8, 7 E. 96th St.;
- The School at Columbia University, grades K–8, 556 W. 110th St.
- La Scuola D'Italia Guglielmo Marconi, grades pre-K–12, 12 E. 96th St.
- St. Bernard's School, boys-only school, grades pre-K–9, 4 E. 98th St.

== Nurseries ==
Nurseries, sorted by the youngest age they generally accept, include:

- Rita Gold Early Childhood Center, for children 6 weeks to 5 years old, 525 W. 120th St., only for families associated with Columbia University
- Imagine Early Learning Center at Mt. Sinai Medical Center, for children 3 months to 5 years old, 60–62 E. 97th St.
- Bank St. Family Center, for children 6 months to 4.9 years old, 610 W. 112th St.
- Children's Learning Center, for children 6 months to 5 years old, 90 LaSalle St.
- Tompkins Hall Nursery School and Childcare Center, for children 15 months to 5 years old, 21 Claremont Av.
- Family Annex, for children 1 year 6 months to 5 years old, 560 W. 113th St.
- Barnard College Center for Toddler Development, for children 1.7 years to 3.0 years old, 3009 Broadway, at 120th St.
- City College's Child Development and Family Services Center, for children 2–6 years old, 133rd St. and Convent Ave.;, only for children of City College students
- The Columbia-Greenhouse Nursery School, for children 2–5 years old, 404 & 424 W. 116th St.
- The Red Balloon Community Day Care Center, for children 2–5 years old, 560 Riverside Dr.
- The Riverside Church Weekday School, for children 2–5 years old, 490 Riverside Dr.
- St. Benedict's Day Nursery, for children 2–6 years old for grades pre-K to K, 21 W. 124th St.; Roman Catholic
- St. Hilda's and St. Hugh's School, for children 2–13 years old, 619 W. 114th St.
- Broadway Presbyterian Church Nursery School, for children 2.9–5 years old, 601 W. 114th St.
- Bank St. School for Children, for children 3–13 years old, 610 W. 112th St.
- Hollingworth Preschool of Teachers College, Columbia University, for children 3–5 years old, at Teachers College, Columbia University
- La Scuola d'Italia Guglielmo Marconi, for children 3 years old and up for pre-K to grade 12, 12 E. 96th St.

== Higher education ==
Colleges and universities include:

- Barnard College, primarily for a liberal arts degree, 3009 Broadway; for women
- Boricua College, 3755 Broadway
- City College of New York (CCNY), undergraduate and graduate degrees and part of the studies for a medical degree, 160 Convent Av.
- Columbia University, undergraduate, graduate, and professional degrees, 2960 Broadway:
  - Columbia's expansion with competition for land has been a community issue
- Helene Fuld College of Nursing, AAS and BS degrees, 24 East 120th Street, Manhattan
- Jewish Theological Seminary of America, undergraduate and graduate degrees, 3080 Broadway
  - Albert A. List College of Jewish Studies, B.A. degree, 3080 Broadway:
- Manhattan School of Music, undergraduate and graduate programs, 601 W. 122nd St.
- New York College of Podiatric Medicine, 53 East 124th Street
- Teachers College, graduate degrees, 525 W. 120th St.:
  - Part of Columbia University
- Touro College of Osteopathic Medicine, 230 W. 125th St.
- Touro College of Pharmacy, 230 W. 125th St.

== Libraries ==
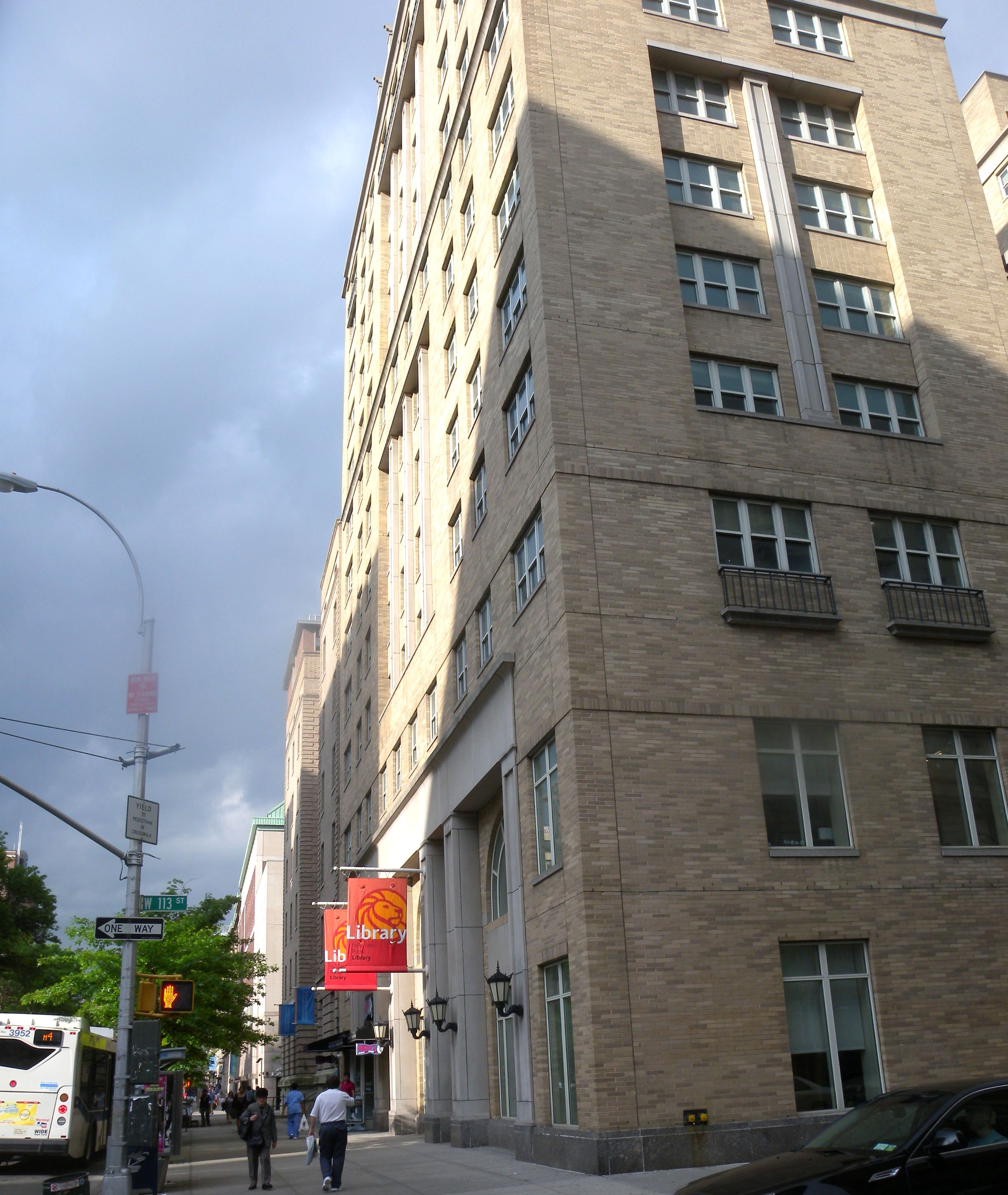
New York Public Library, Morningside branch

Public libraries are suited to self-directed learning and the New York Public Library offer free online access from home to databases for research. The NYPL has one research library and ten local branches (listed here with the research library first followed by the local branches approximately from south to north):

- Schomburg Center for Research in Black Culture, 515 Lenox Avenue, is the research library
- 96th Street branch, 112 E. 96th St.
- Aguilar branch, 174 E. 110th St.
- Morningside Heights branch, 2900 Broadway
- 115th Street branch, 203 W. 115th St.
- Harlem branch, 9 W. 124th St.
- 125th Street branch, 224 E. 125th St.
- George Bruce branch, 518 W. 125th St.
- Hamilton Grange branch, 503 W. 145th St.
- Macomb's Bridge branch, 2633 Adam Clayton Powell Jr. Blvd.

== See also ==
- Education in New York City
