= Kareem Burke =

American music executive (born 1974)

- Born: January 19, 1974 (age 52); Manhattan, New York City, U.S.
- Other name: Kareem "Biggs" Burke
- Occupations: Entrepreneur; record executive; film producer
- Years active: 1994–present
- Known for: Co-founder of Roc-A-Fella Records

Kareem "Biggs" Burke (born January 19, 1974) is an American entrepreneur, record executive, and producer. He is best known as the co-founder of Roc-A-Fella Records along with Shawn "Jay-Z" Carter and Damon "Dame" Dash.

== Early life ==
Kareem Burke was born in Harlem, New York City, on January 19, 1974. Burke has several siblings, C. Burke, Brian L Burke, Robert "Bobalob" Burke, Kyambo R. "Hip-Hop" Joshua (half-brother), Jamil "Mal" Clay and a sister, Rochelle Burke. In 2003, his brother Robert E. Burke III was murdered in the Bronx.

== Career ==
In 1995, Burke co-founded the record label Roc-A-Fella Records with Shawn "Jay-Z" Carter and Damon "Dame" Dash. In 2004, Roc-A-Fella Records was purchased by Def Jam Recordings (which had previously only owned half of the company).

In 2017, Burke hired Julia Lang to work as his image consultant for two years. In 2018, Burke executive produced the film, O.G. which premiered on HBO on February 23, 2019.

In February 2019, it was announced that Burke had signed Saint Jhn to his management company, Circle of Success. Burke has spoken about how meeting Saint Jhn pushed his management vision further, as he heard Saint Jhn's music at a listening party. According to Burke, "The night [Roc Nation co-founder Tyran Smith], played a preview of Saint Jhn's new album, I drove home listening to Collection One and had an immediate sonic connection to his music." Shortly after, Burke became Saint Jhn's manager.

=== It's a Hard Truth, Ain't It ===
In August 2020, Biggs took to social media to announce an Emmy nomination for "It's a Hard Truth, Ain't It". Kareem Burke co-directed and executive produced the project and it premiered at the 2018 Tribeca Film Festival alongside O.G., another film that was produced at Indiana's Pendleton Correctional Facility during the same period. "It's a Hard Truth..." documents thirteen incarcerated men as they study filmmaking while exploring a therapeutic process of how they landed in prison with lengthy sentences. The men all received directors credit for the film along with O.G. director Madeleine Sackler. Several of those thirteen men were also cast as first-time actors in O.G., having the opportunity to work with Tony, Golden Globe, and Emmy winning actor, Jeffrey Wright. "It's a Hard Truth Ain't It" is the first widely released documentary to be directed by men still incarcerated in a maximum security prison.

== Legal issues ==
On June 4, 2012, Burke was sentenced to five years in prison after pleading guilty to conspiring to distribute more than 100 kilos of marijuana. In addition to the prison time, Burke had to forfeit $15,000 in cash, his $660,000 house in New Jersey, and his BMW car. In November 2015, Burke was released from prison.

== See also ==
- List of people from Harlem
