= Charter schools in New York =

Charter schools in New York are independent, not-for-profit public schools operating under a different set of rules than the typical state-run schools, exempt from many requirements and regulations. Any student eligible for public schools can apply.

== Authorizers ==
A charter school may be authorized by the State University of New York (through its Charter Schools Institute), New York State's Education Department's Board of Regents, or the New York City Department of Education (through the chancellor's office and the deputy executive director).

== Governing state law ==
State laws govern the establishing and supervision of charter schools. The New York Charter Schools Act of 1998, as amended, is codified as Education Law §§ 2850–2857. Regulations appear in New York Codes, Rules and Regulations (NYCRR).

Any locality that has authorization to establish charter schools may have local law governing the process.

The 1998 State statutory provisions passed when then-Governor George Pataki included them in legislation giving otherwise-opposed legislators a pay raise and limiting the number of charters.

A state legislator's election was contested because of charter school issues.

== Growth of schools ==
As of the 2023-24 school year, New York [State] has 343 operating charter schools serving over 170,000 students.

== Charter School Demand ==
Although the number of charter schools in New York is at an all-time high, parent demand has long exceeded the supply. That has resulted in long waitlists of students. Organizations such as the New York City Charter School Center are working to eliminate the limit on the number of charter schools that can open in New York.

=== Statewide cap on number of schools ===
In the first state legislation passed to regulate charter schools in 1998, a statewide cap of 100 schools with set so legislators could determine their success before expanding the initiative. Whether to double the maximum was debated and the legislative bill was subjected to lobbying in 2007 before it passed.

The 2007 revisions raised the cap on charter numbers to 200, with 100 being granted by the Board of Regents (BOR) on SUNY's suggestion and the remaining 100 being granted on the proposals of the other charter bodies listed in the Act. Of the additional charters, up to 50 were set aside for New York City. The other charter entities reached the 2007 maximum, leaving just SUNY's charter subject to the 2007 cap.

As of the 2010 changes, the maximum quantity of charters that could be granted was limited to 460. This included 200 from the 2007 limitation plus an extra 260, of which 130 would be granted based on SUNY's proposal and the remaining 130 would be granted by the BOR. There were restrictions placed on the number of charters issued to charter schools in New York City.

The 2015 amendments which imposed a 460 charter cap, stipulate that charters must be granted on SUNY or the BOR's recommendation, and cap the total number of charters that can be granted to New York City charter schools on or after July 1, 2015, at 50. Following the 2015 modifications to the Education Law, 84 charters remain available for issuance. The 2015 changes also allow up to 22 charters that have been surrendered, canceled, terminated, or not renewed to be reissued upon the suggestion of the BOR or SUNY.

The 2023 changes maintain the 460 charter cap, but they allow for the reissuance of up to 22 charters that were relinquished, revoked, terminated, or not renewed after January 1, 2015, and before July 1, 2022, with the approval of the BOR or SUNY. In addition, new charters cannot be allowed in a geographic region of New York City where at least 55% of the children are enrolled in charter schools. Of the 22 available charters, no more than 14 may be granted to charter schools in the city.

=== Governmental political support ===
In New York City, support by Mayor Michael Bloomberg for new charter schools was substantial but whether substantial mayoral support would continue after a new Mayor was elected in 2013 was, according to an official of Success Academy Charter Schools, unknown. According to reporter Michael Powell, "the charter school wars ... could define the next [2013] mayoral election", with the teachers' union, some parents groups, and New York Communities for Change opposing the opening of more charter schools and Bloomberg supporting StudentsFirstNY in favor of same.

For political advocacy, according to Geoff Decker in 2012, while independent charter school operators tended to "quietly steer ... clear of front-line battles over ideology", some charter school group operators, including Success Academy Charter Schools, KIPP, Public Prep, and Uncommon Schools, "see charter schools as a weapon in a political fight against teachers unions to reform the larger school system and believe that the fight requires robust, hands-on organizing and lobbying efforts", and, in 2011, led a rally with 2,500 people.

== Evaluations ==
The New York City Department of Education surveys parents and teachers, and, for 6th grade and higher, students, in every school every year about qualities of the school. Comparisons are possible where response rates are reasonably high. Results may indicate some of the strengths and weaknesses of a school. According to Brill, "the central evidentiary value of charters like ... [Success Academies] .... [is that] [t]hey proved that intense, effective teaching could overcome poverty and other obstacles and that, as Klein liked to say, demography does not have to be destiny."

== Specific schools ==
Among charter schools are Achievement First charter network, La Cima Elementary Charter School, Democracy Prep charter network, Harlem Village Academy charter network, KIPP, Public Prep, Staten Island Community Charter School, and Success Academy Charter Schools. A list of charter schools is available from the Charter Schools Institute. A list of charter and public non charter schools is available from the New York State Education Department.

One charter school founded with its board chair as Randi Weingarten, who also then headed the United Federation of Teachers, a teachers' union, proposed collaboration between teachers and management and a normal-length school day. New York City public schools then-chancellor Joel Klein was "thrilled" for the school's founding, according to journalist Steven Brill, partly because once that school needed space in a public non charter school the union could not object to the principle of collocation and he could arrange for other charters to share space with non charters. Its first charter was approved in 2005. The renewal in 2010 was proposed to be limited to 3 years instead of the normal 5, because the school had "an ambiguous or mixed record of educational achievement", with only 34 percent of students being proficient in math when tested and 28 percent of students doing so in English.

== Influence on non charters ==
Studies of the impact of charters on public schools have produced mixed results.

A 2017 study from Temple University showed the positive effects NYC charter schools have made on neighboring district schools. The analysis, based on data from the New York City Department of Education (NYCDOE), found that "charter schools have small positive spillovers on public school students, increasing math and ELA performance." The study also found that charter schools have no significant negative effect on their neighboring district school.

But most studies find that charter schools have not achieved their original mission of creating innovative educational practices that can be brought back to public schools. Further, charter schools have placed significant strain on public school resources: "Despite expenditure cutting measures, districts simultaneously facing rapid student population decline and/or operating in states with particularly inequitable, under-resourced school finance systems have faced substantial annual deficits."

== Charter Schools Record of Educational Results ==
By certain measures, charter schools in New York City outperform their district school counterparts on an annual basis. These measures emphasize the numbers of students proficient at a given grade level. However, they don't account for the fact that students in charter schools are self-selecting. And although charters purportedly admit students by lottery, multiple reports indicate that charter schools employ methods that exclude students who have a lower likelihood of grade-level proficiency. As a result, the profiles of students entering charter schools vary significantly from those entering charter schools. Such selective admission practices make it difficult to compare proficiency levels across public and charter schools.

In the 2017 annual New York State assessments: 53% of New York City charter school students were proficient in English Language Arts (ELA), compared with 38% of NYC district students. In math, 48% of charter students were proficient; 41% of district students were proficient. Among African-Americans: 52% of charter students could do math at grade level, only 20% of district students were proficient. For ELA: 49% of African-American charter students were proficient; 29% of district students were proficient. Among Hispanic students: 48% of charter students were proficient in math; 25% of Hispanic district school students were proficient in math. And in ELA: 45% of Hispanic charter school students could read at grade level; while 30% of Hispanic district students were proficient.

Analysis from The Future of Children, a journal published by Princeton University and the Brookings Institution, found that "On average, charter schools perform at about the same level as traditional public schools." However, the report also found that charter schools employing a "no excuses" approach are more effective at closing the achievement gap than those that don't. An analysis by The Center for Research on Education Outcomes (CREDO) at Stanford University showed "the benefits for charter students are as if the students received 34 days of additional learning in reading and 63 additional days in math in the course of a school year."

Other studies have found that, when controlling for incoming populations, charter schools lag behind public schools in student performance. "A well-publicized study of charter schools by the Center for Research on Education Outcomes (CREDO) in 15 states and the District of Columbia studied 70% of the students enrolled in charter schools in the U.S. They found 17 percent of charters posted academic gains that were significantly better than traditional public schools, 37 percent of charter schools were significantly worse, and 46 percent were statistically indistinguishable. Another recent study by Zimmer et al. found that charters in five jurisdictions were performing the same as traditional public schools, while charter schools in two other jurisdictions were performing worse."

=== Emulation and choice through competition ===
Former New York City School Chancellor Joel I. Klein argued that charters don't substitute for public non charters but do demonstrate improvements that non charters might emulate and, by letting parents choose schools, break the non charter monopoly.

=== Draining of resources from public schools ===
Arguments include that innovations in the charter schools should be provided in the non charter public schools, smaller class sizes require more financing and public non charters need that finance, and benefits should be provided to the many students in non charter public schools rather than to just the few attending charters, especially since students who are rejected by charters must be accepted by the public schools, so more support should go to public non charter schools.

However, charter schools receive less per-pupil funding from the State government than do public non charter schools, one legislative leader saying that charter schools have been claiming that being nonunion allows cost-saving.

=== Management being for profit ===
In New York State, all charter schools are non-profit educational institutions with distinct Boards of Trustees (501c3). Board members must remain independent of any for-profit entity connected with the school, according to both state and federal law. However, in some cases, those boards may contract with a management company. This became controversial when those management companies were for-profit. As for 2010, NYS law no longer allows for-profit management companies to contract with charter schools, leaving only 6 schools contracted with for-profit management under the previous law.

Whether charter schools should be either run by for-profit businesses or supported with for-profit management support organizations has been challenged. One side argues that money is going to pay profit (rather than to educate children) and therefore that for-profit managements should be banned. The other side argues that a for-profit management firm is assisting a school in producing academic results, the school can focus on academics and accountability, the firm can raise major funds, just 2% of the nearly 300 charter schools in New York State are run for profit,.

=== Competition for space in public noncharter schools ===
There has been criticism that charter schools are often given space in public noncharter schools, constraining the latter. A counterargument is that, at least in New York City, the schools losing space are generally not educating well and the space is going to charter schools that generally do better at educating students. A counterargument to that is that the two sets of schools are not educating the same students, leaving students in the noncharter schools with fewer resources for their needs. A counterargument to that is that noncharter students generally may apply to other schools to get access to better education. A counterargument to that is that space is limited in many schools.

Another counterargument (to the argument that collocation constrains noncharters' space) is that the cost of renovating existing school space is far lower than the cost of renting, buying, or building fresh real estate.

==== Closing public noncharters & accommodating charters ====
A court ruled on March 26, 2010, that the City of New York government could not phase out or close certain public high schools currently. The number of schools subject to the court's decision is 19 and that includes 15 high schools. As a consequence, charter schools may not find space in those schools to move into at this time.

The court was the New York State Supreme Court, specifically the court for New York County, i.e., Manhattan; the decision was by Justice Joan B. Lobis.

The order not to close the schools was granted by the court because the City had not complied with the recently amended state law on Mayoral control of the public schools, requiring "meaningful community involvement" in the decision to close a school. "The judge wrote that the [educational] impact statement for ["Paul"] Robeson ["High School in Brooklyn"], for example, did not say where young mothers . . . could find similar programs [in the city] ["like one devised for mothers and pregnant teenagers . . . that offers day care and teaches parenting skills"]." A 20th school, a vocational high school, was slated for closing but the City had opted not to close it because of community feedback favoring preserving its automotive program; the court cited that as an example of what might result from proper procedure for community involvement. While the impact statements were provided online, respondents didn't deny that they were not distributed to parents and others as "hard copies . . . . Although some parents [and others] . . . may have computer and internet [sic] access, certainly not all do." Impact statements were often boilerplate in disclosing information about numbers of seats but not about specialized programs, some participants in the process were scripted when they should instead have been "part of the process of structuring those meetings", and question-and-answer sessions were not allowed at all the meetings where they should have been.

The ruling did not mean, in general, that failing schools couldn't be closed or that these 19 schools were not failing, but that the process applied for deciding on these closures at this time had not been complied with, and that compliance must be "strict". This decision does not prevent the City from closing the schools in the future if the proper procedure is followed.

Among the petitioners or official supporters of the lawsuit were the United Federation of Teachers (UFT), the American Federation of Teachers (AFT), the National Association for the Advancement of Colored People (NAACP), and Alliance for Quality Education, elected political office-holders Scott M. Stringer, Eric Adams, Bill Perkins, Hakeem Jeffries, Alan Maisel, Robert Jackson, Charles Barron, Erik Martin Dilan, Mark Welprin, and Lewis A. Fidler, several parents and school officials, and a teacher. Co-plaintiff Manhattan Borough President Scott Stringer and UFT president Michael Mulgrew supported the court's decision.

The New York City Schools Chancellor nonetheless intends to close the schools, although probably not as soon.

(In the state's court system, the Supreme Court is not the highest in the state, that being the state's Court of Appeals, with the state Supreme Court's Appellate Division coming in between.)

The City has "promised an appeal" and "will appeal immediately."

The Department of Education hopes to find other space for the charter schools (and new public schools) that would have moved into the public schools had they closed. "The New York City Charter School Center said in a statement that it will work with the city 'to assure that charter school students, teachers and parents aren't impacted by this turn of events.'"

=== Admission lottery ===
When qualified applicants outnumber available capacity, a lottery is required, leaving some families disappointed when admission is denied despite otherwise qualifying. A film about the admission lottery at the Success Academy Charter Schools (then known as Harlem Success Academy), possibly typical of many admission lotteries, has been shown as The Lottery. It was inspired by a 2008 lottery.

=== Scalability of model ===
For charters to be a model for the larger public non charter school systems, teachers in the larger system have to be replaceable by teachers able to practice the more intense teaching model applied in charters, but some argue there may not be enough of the latter teachers available so that upgrading may take a decade, teachers' unions may resist replacement, and politicians may be unwilling to seek a difficult change that lacks much short-term benefit. Some disagree, for example, Eva Moskowitz of Success Academy Charter Schools arguing that scalability is hard but within reach.

=== CEO compensation ===
Some chief executive officers of charter schools have been criticized for accepting pay that is substantially more than that of the New York City Schools Chancellor or the former State University of New York (SUNY) Chancellor for running many more schools or colleges, respectively, with many more students. The New York City Chancellor shared management and support with approximately 62,000 nonteaching personnel in Fiscal Year 2009–2010. SUNY's Chancellor shared responsibility with 87,362 employees, including 54,162 non-faculty and 283 in system administration (estimates), as of November, 2009. The compensation has also been compared with that of first-year law firm associates and supported with the argument from political liberals that teachers and school leaders should be paid well for valuable and challenging work.

=== Turnover ===
From 2008 to 2010, "charter schools have generally experienced relatively high teacher turnover", with attrition averaging 25% state-wide.

=== Nepotism in contracts and hiring ===
A journalistic investigation uncovered several charter schools awarding contracts or a teaching position to relatives of school leaders.

=== Union representation ===
Most charter schools in the state are not unionized. Some organizing of charter school staff has led to unionization, although members at one school, the KIPP AMP Academy Charter School in Crown Heights, Brooklyn, N.Y., have begun seeking an end to their union representation.

State law, enacted in 2007 with the doubling of the cap, requires union representation for larger charter schools except for those already existing, potentially impacting the financial viability of schools attempting to achieve economies of scale as their student enrollments grow.

Steven Brill changed his position on charter schools and unions after two years of researching school reform because he claimed a better understanding of the complexities. He reversed his view of union leader Randi Weingarten and suggested she run the New York City school system.

=== Supervision failures with disciplinary violence ===
At one school, New York City's Special Commissioner of Investigation for the New York City School District (SCI) found the school failed to adequately document incidents involving student violence and staff responses that included violence called Therapeutic Crisis Intervention (TCI). "'If everybody knows about a restraint and nobody reports it,' he [Commissioner Richard Condon] said, 'then it's not unfair to conclude they were covering it up.'" "The school serves some of the city's lowest-performing and troubled students who can be tough to handle."

== See also ==
- Education in New York

== Sources ==
- Brill, Steven (2012). Class Warfare: Inside the Fight to Fix America's Schools. Simon and Schuster. ISBN 978-1-4516-1201-1.
