= Julia Lang =

Julia Lang may refer to:

- Julia Lang (entrepreneur) (born 1989), German Tanzanian creative director and serial entrepreneur
- Julia (programming language), a programming language
- Julia Lang (actress) (1921–2010), British film and radio actress and radio presenter
- Júlia Láng (born 2003), Hungarian figure skater
