= It's a Hard Truth Ain't It =

- Directed by: Madeleine Sackler
- Production company: Great Curve Films
- Release date: April 25, 2018 (Tribeca)
- Running time: 81 minutes
- Country: United States
- Language: English

It's A Hard Truth Ain't It is a 2018 American documentary film directed by Madeleine Sackler, Dennis Brown, Franklin Cox, Brandon Crider, Clifford Elswick, Joseph Henderson, Herb Robertson, Rushawn Tanksley, Marshaun Bugg, Al'jonon Coleman, James Collins, Quentis Hardiman, Charles Lawrence, and Mark Thacker.

It is the first widely released film co-directed by people who are incarcerated. In the film, 13 men incarcerated in the Pendleton Correctional Facility in Indiana study filmmaking with Sackler to tell their own stories. Sackler's fiction film, O.G., was in part inspired by the work done for this documentary; many of the co-directors in It's A Hard Truth Ain't It also appear in O.G.

It's A Hard Truth Ain't It was nominated for an Emmy Award in the Outstanding Arts and Culture Documentary category.

Animated portrayals of the men's memories were created by Yoni Goodman.

The film and O.G. were both acquired by HBO after premiering at the Tribeca Film Festival.
