= Madeleine Sackler =

American director, editor and producer (born 1983)

- Born: 1983 (age 42–43); Oklahoma City, Oklahoma, United States
- Education: Duke University (BS)
- Occupation: Filmmaker
- Notable work: The Lottery; It's a Hard Truth Ain't It; O.G.
- Parent: Jonathan Sackler
- Family: Sackler
- Website: Official website

Madeleine Sackler (born 1983) is an American filmmaker and Sackler family heiress. She received an Emmy Award in 2015 and was nominated for a second in 2020. Her grandfather, Raymond, was one of the three Sackler brothers who created and owned Purdue Pharma, infamous for its role in the Opioid epidemic. She has received criticism for her family fortune, which derives mostly from the sale and manufacture of the highly addictive pharmaceutical opioid Oxycontin, the central drug in the opioid crisis.

The Sackler family, including Madeleine Sackler, is profiled in various media, including the documentary Crime of the Century on HBO and in the book Empire of Pain by Patrick Keefe. As outlined in the book, she has scrupulously denied her family’s role in one of America’s largest public health crises, which has claimed the lives of over 600,000 people.

== Early life and education ==
Sackler was born in 1983, and grew up in Greenwich, Connecticut. She went to public high school and attended Duke University. Sackler was a biopsychology major at Duke and considered going to med school. However, she was equally interested in reading, writing and photography. Sackler incorporated these interests into her time at Duke with a minor in English, a photography elective, and creating a documentary short as an independent study.. She has a Jewish ancestry.

== Career ==
After graduating from Duke University, Sackler used her skills in computer software to begin her career as a film editor. She directed her first documentary titled The Lottery in 2010. Sackler has since filmed more documentaries, including Dangerous Acts Starring the Unstable Elements of Belarus and It's a Hard Truth Ain't It. In 2018, Sackler released her first fictional film, O.G. starring Jeffrey Wright and Theothus Carter and released by HBO. Sackler has also produced some of her own films, and is the founder of a production company Great Curve Films.

Sackler's films deal with themes such as public education, censorship and dictatorship, and incarceration and rehabilitation. Her film-making style has been described as darkly humorous and eye-opening.

=== The Lottery (2010) ===
The Lottery is a documentary directed by Sackler. The film follows four families that are hoping to enroll their children in the Harlem Success Academy charter school in New York City. While the charter school has been proven to provide a superior education than public schools, there are only 475 slots and over 3,000 applicants. In this film, Sackler focuses on the power politics that are embedded in public education and the controversy that follows. She argues that this charter school "lottery" is a result of corruption in the public education system. Along with exposing the public education system, The Lottery places emphasis on the achievement gap between minority and white students, and the oppression minority students and families experience in public education.

=== Duke 91&92: Back to Back (2012) ===
Duke 91&92: Back to Back is a documentary for Turner Sports produced and directed by Sackler and Amy Unell in 2012 and executive produced by Grant Hill and Christian Laettner. The documentary highlighted the back-to-back National Championships the Duke University Blue Devils won in the 1991 and 1992 NCAA championships.

=== Dangerous Acts Starring the Unstable Elements of Belarus (2013) ===
Dangerous Acts Starring the Unstable Elements of Belarus is an observational documentary directed by Sackler for HBO. It was the winner of the 2015 Emmy for Outstanding Arts and Cultural Programming. Sackler began production on the film in Belarus in the summer of 2010. She gathered footage of Belarus Free Theatre, an underground theatre group that had been censored and deemed illegal by the Belarus government. In the documentary, Sackler captures the theatre group's performances, as well as their everyday lives and struggles under what they consider to be totalitarian control. Sackler also films tense political moments; six months into filming, Belarus experienced an election that resulted in Alexander Lukashanko, who some have called 'Europe's last dictator', winning a fourth-consecutive term as president against democratic candidate Andrei Sannikov. Following the election there were riots with civilians clashing with police followed by arrests including opposition candidates, with some members of Belarus Free Theatre being involved and others fleeing for countries such as England and America. This turbulent election altered Sackler's documentary from themes of dictatorship, power, and censorship, to topics of exile, family, and home.

Due to the political climate in Belarus, the footage and interviews that were created for this documentary had to be recorded in secrecy and smuggled out of the country over the border of Belarus to avoid detection and disruption from the government.

=== O.G. and It's a Hard Truth Ain't It (2018) ===
Sackler made two films that were filmed entirely in prison. One is a fictional drama titled O.G. and the second is a cinéma vérité-style documentary called It's a Hard Truth Ain't It. Sackler and her production crew filmed in Pendleton Correctional Facility in Indiana. This is the first time that a fiction and non-fiction film have been filmed entirely inside a Level 4 prison.

O.G. is Sackler's first fictional film; she is the director and a producer. It features over one-hundred-twenty prison inmates as lead actors and extras, as well as dozens of guards. The plot follows an older prison inmate, played by Jeffrey Wright, who on the verge of release befriends a younger inmate. The role of the younger inmate was played by an actual inmate Theothus Carter, who was in prison for drug dealing and fighting. The script for O.G. has been modeled after the real experiences of prison inmates. The film has been credited as not following traditional prison movie clichés, such as an evil warden, rape scene, or solitary confinement segment, but rather focusing on the prison as a village. Sackler became interested in the prison system while filming her first documentary The Lottery, about the public education system. The connection between education, or lack thereof, and incarceration inspired her to create O.G. O.G. is coproduced by George Clooney and Grant Heslov's company Smokehouse Pictures. In 2019 HBO bought the rights to the film.

It's a Hard Truth Ain't It is cinéma vérité-style documentary directed and produced by Sackler. During the five-year production time of the film O.G., Sackler simultaneously recorded interviews and led a documentary filmmaking workshop for inmates at Pendleton Correctional Facility. It's a Hard Truth Ain't It features inmate's footage and interviews, as well as animation by Yoni Goodman.

== Filmography ==
Year	Title	Role	Notes
2010	The Lottery	Director	Documentary, shortlisted for 2011 Academy Awards
2012	Duke 91 & 92: Back to Back	Director	Documentary
2013	Dangerous Acts Starring the Unstable Elements of Belarus	Director	Documentary, winner of 2015 Outstanding Arts and Cultural Programming News & Documentary Emmy Award
2018	O.G.	Director, producer	Narrative film
2018	It's a Hard Truth Ain't It	Director, producer	Documentary
2025	O Horizon	Director, writer	Narrative film

== Awards and nominations ==
Sackler's first film The Lottery was shortlisted for an Academy Award in 2011. Her second film Dangerous Acts Starring the Unstable Elements of Belarus won the award for Outstanding Arts and Cultural Programming at the News & Documentary Emmy Awards.

In August 2020, Sackler received an Emmy nomination for directing the HBO documentary, It's a Hard Truth, Ain't It, marking the first time anyone in prison has made a nominated film, as the film was co-directed by thirteen men inside the Pendleton Correctional Facility.

== Criticism ==
After working with Sackler, actor Jeffrey Wright subsequently called Sackler's prison films "fundamentally flawed" due to her failure to acknowledge the Sackler family's own role in contributing to drug abuse in America while telling the inmates' stories. "[W]hen you take that element of transparency out of the equation, when doing that hides the significance of your story as it relates to their stories, then there's something rotten that can't be expunged," he said.

New Yorker author Patrick Radden Keefe, in a biography of the Sackler family, observed that Sackler "was able to weigh in, sagely, on the plight of America's prison population without being asked to account for her own familial connection to one of the underlying drivers of that crisis." Vanity Fair described Sackler as being "known to brush off questions about the original source of her money". In an interview with The Guardian, artist Nan Goldin described Sackler's films as a form of "reputation washing", saying Sackler "presents herself as a social activist but she has been enriched through the addiction of hundreds of thousands of people.”
