= List of awards and nominations received by Jeffrey Wright =

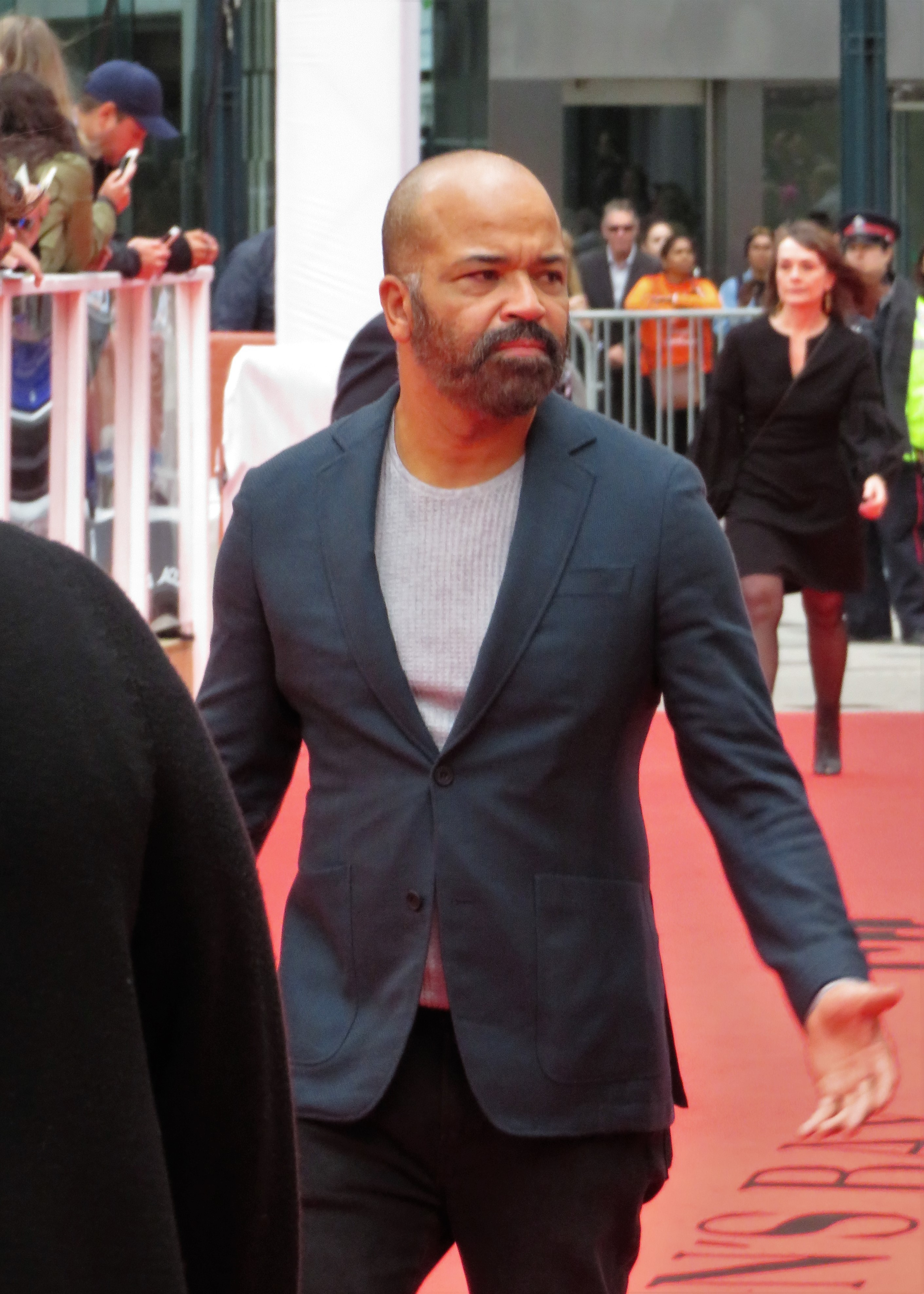
Jeffrey Wright at the Toronto International Film Festival in 2018

This article is a list of awards and nominations received by Jeffrey Wright.

Jeffrey Wright is an American actor known for his roles on stage and film. Wright has received numerous accolades including a Golden Globe Award, a Primetime Emmy Award, and a Tony Award as well as a nomination for the Academy Award and four Screen Actors Guild Awards.

For his role as a frustrated writer Dr. Thelonious "Monk" Ellison in American Fiction (2023) he received nominations for the Academy Award, Golden Globe Award, and Screen Actors Guild Award for Best Actor. He won the Tony Award for Best Featured Actor in a Play for his playing numerous roles including Mr. Lies, Norman "Belize" Arriaga, and the Angel Europa in the Broadway play Angels in America (1994). He received a nomination for the Tony Award for Best Actor in a Play for Topdog/Underdog (2002). Angels in America was adapted into the 2003 HBO miniseries of the same name for which he received the Primetime Emmy Award for Outstanding Supporting Actor - Miniseries or a Movie and the Golden Globe Award for Best Supporting Actor - Series, Miniseries or Television Film. He received a British Academy Games Award for his voice role in Dispatch (2025).

== Major associations ==
=== Academy Awards ===
Year	Category	Nominated work	Result	Ref.
2023	Best Actor	American Fiction	Nominated	

=== BAFTA Games Awards ===
Year	Category	Nominated work	Result	Ref.
2026	Performer in a Supporting Role	Dispatch	Won	

=== Emmy Awards ===
Year	Category	Nominated work	Result	Ref.
Primetime Emmy Award
2004	Outstanding Supporting Actor in a Miniseries or a Movie	Angels in America	Won	
2017	Outstanding Supporting Actor in a Drama Series	Westworld	Nominated	
2018	Outstanding Lead Actor in a Drama Series	Westworld	Nominated	
2020	Outstanding Supporting Actor in a Drama Series	Westworld	Nominated	
2022	Outstanding Character Voice-Over Performance	What If...?: What If... Ultron Won?	Nominated	
2025	Outstanding Character Voice-Over Performance	What If...?: What If... 1872?	Nominated	
2025	Outstanding Guest Actor in a Drama Series	The Last of Us	Nominated	

=== Golden Globe Awards ===
Year	Category	Nominated work	Result	Ref.
2003	Best Supporting Actor – Television	Angels in America	Won	
2023	Best Actor – Motion Picture Musical or Comedy	American Fiction	Nominated	

=== Screen Actors Guild Awards ===
Year	Category	Nominated work	Result	Ref.
2003	Outstanding Actor in a Miniseries or TV Movie	Angels in America	Nominated	
2016	Outstanding Ensemble in a Drama Series	Westworld	Nominated	
2023	Outstanding Actor in a Leading Role	American Fiction	Nominated	
2023	Outstanding Cast in a Motion Picture	American Fiction	Nominated	

=== Tony Awards ===
Year	Category	Nominated work	Result	Ref.
1994	Best Featured Actor in a Play	Angels in America: Perestroika	Won	
2002	Best Actor in a Play	Topdog/Underdog	Nominated	

== Miscellaneous awards ==
Year	Award	Category	Work	Result
2002	AFI Awards	AFI Actor of the Year – Male – Movie or Mini-Series	Boycott	Won
2005	Black Movie Awards	Outstanding Performance by an Actor in a Supporting Role	Syriana	Nominated
2002	Black Reel Awards	Network/Cable – Best Actor	Boycott	Nominated
2004	Black Reel Awards	Television: Best Supporting Actor	Angels in America	Won
2005	Black Reel Awards	Best Supporting Actor	The Manchurian Candidate	Nominated
2006	Black Reel Awards	Best Supporting Actor – Television	Lackawanna Blues	Won
2006	Black Reel Awards	Best Supporting Actor	Syriana	Nominated
2008	Black Reel Awards	Best Supporting Actor	Cadillac Records	Won
2008	Black Reel Awards	Best Ensemble	Cadillac Records	Won
2016	Black Reel Awards	Outstanding Voice Performance	The Good Dinosaur	Nominated
2022	Black Reel Awards	Outstanding Supporting Actor	The French Dispatch	Nominated
2023	Black Reel Awards	Outstanding Supporting Actor	The Batman	Nominated
2024	Black Reel Awards	Outstanding Lead Performance	American Fiction	Won
2007	Chicago International Film Festival	Career Achievement Award		Won
2012	Critics' Choice Movie Awards	Best Acting Ensemble	The Ides of March	Nominated
2024	Critics' Choice Movie Awards	Best Actor	American Fiction	Nominated
1997	Independent Spirit Awards	Best Debut Performance	Basquiat	Nominated
2006	Independent Spirit Awards	Best Supporting Male	Broken Flowers	Nominated
2024	Independent Spirit Awards	Best Lead Performance	American Fiction	Won
2026	Karlovy Vary International Film Festival	Festival President's Award	Fundamental contribution to the development of film and cinema,	Honored
2002	NAACP Image Awards	Outstanding Actor in a Television Movie, Mini-Series or Dramatic Special	Boycott	Nominated
2006	NAACP Image Awards	Outstanding Actor in a Television Movie, Mini-Series or Dramatic Special	Lackawanna Blues	Nominated
2009	NAACP Image Awards	Outstanding Actor in a Motion Picture	Cadillac Records	Nominated
2012	NAACP Image Awards	Outstanding Supporting Actor in a Motion Picture	The Ides of March	Nominated
2005	San Diego Film Critics Society Awards	Best Supporting Actor	Broken Flowers	Won
2024	Santa Barbara International Film Festival	Montecito Award		Honored
2002	Satellite Awards	Best Actor in a Miniseries or Television Film	Boycott	Nominated
2004	Satellite Awards	Best Supporting Actor in a Series, Miniseries or Television Film	Angels in America	Nominated
2017	Saturn Awards	Best Supporting Actor on a Television Series	Westworld	Nominated
2019	Saturn Awards	Best Actor on a Television Series	Westworld	Nominated
2000	Toronto Film Critics Association Awards	Best Supporting Performance, Male	Shaft (tied with Tobey Maguire for Wonder Boys)	Won
