= Dangerous Acts Starring the Unstable Elements of Belarus =

2013 documentary film

- Directed by: Madeleine Sackler
- Distributed by: HBO
- Release date: 2013
- Country: United States
- Language: English

Dangerous Acts Starring the Unstable Elements of Belarus is a 2013 American documentary film directed by Madeleine Sackler detailing the experiences of the illicit Belarus Free Theatre (BFT) during the political revolution of independence. The film's footage from Belarus was smuggled out by the camerawomen in Belarus. Other scenes were filmed in the United States and the United Kingdom, including uncensored interviews with BFT actors.

The film documents the personal and artistic struggles of several members of the BFT, showing the high costs they are forced to pay when defying the governing regime. It also documents one of the presidential candidates, Andrei Sannikov, who was arrested by the KGB following his presidential run.

== Cast ==
- Pavel Gorodnickij
- Nicolai Khalezin, co-founder of BFT
- Natalia Kaliada, co-founder of BFT
- Tatyana Mikhailovna Kaliada
- Andrei Andreevich Kaliada
- Andrei Sannikov
- Oleg Sidorchik
- Vladimir Shcherban, co-founder of BFT
- Yana Rusakevich
- Maryna Yurevich

== Awards ==
The film premiered at the Toronto International Film Festival and won many awards at several film festivals, including the International Documentary Film Festival in Amsterdam, where the film was a "Top Twenty Audience Favorite." The film received second prize at the TRT Documentary Awards, and a 2015 Emmy Award for Outstanding Arts and Culture Programming in the News and Documentary category.

== Reception ==
Reviewers called the film "engrossing" and "powerful and stirring". It retains a 91% Rotten Tomatoes score. "Not only is it moving to watch these artists express their rage and frustration and tell the stories of their lives, but their urgency and compulsion to perform against all odds feeds their art. It's damned compelling."

The final scenes of the movie are a collection of supportive endorsements for BFT from Philip Seymour Hoffman, Kevin Kline, Lou Reed, Mick Jagger, Jude Law and the late Czech playwright-president Vaclav Havel. The film was picked up by HBO.
