= Jeffrey Wright =

American actor (born 1965)

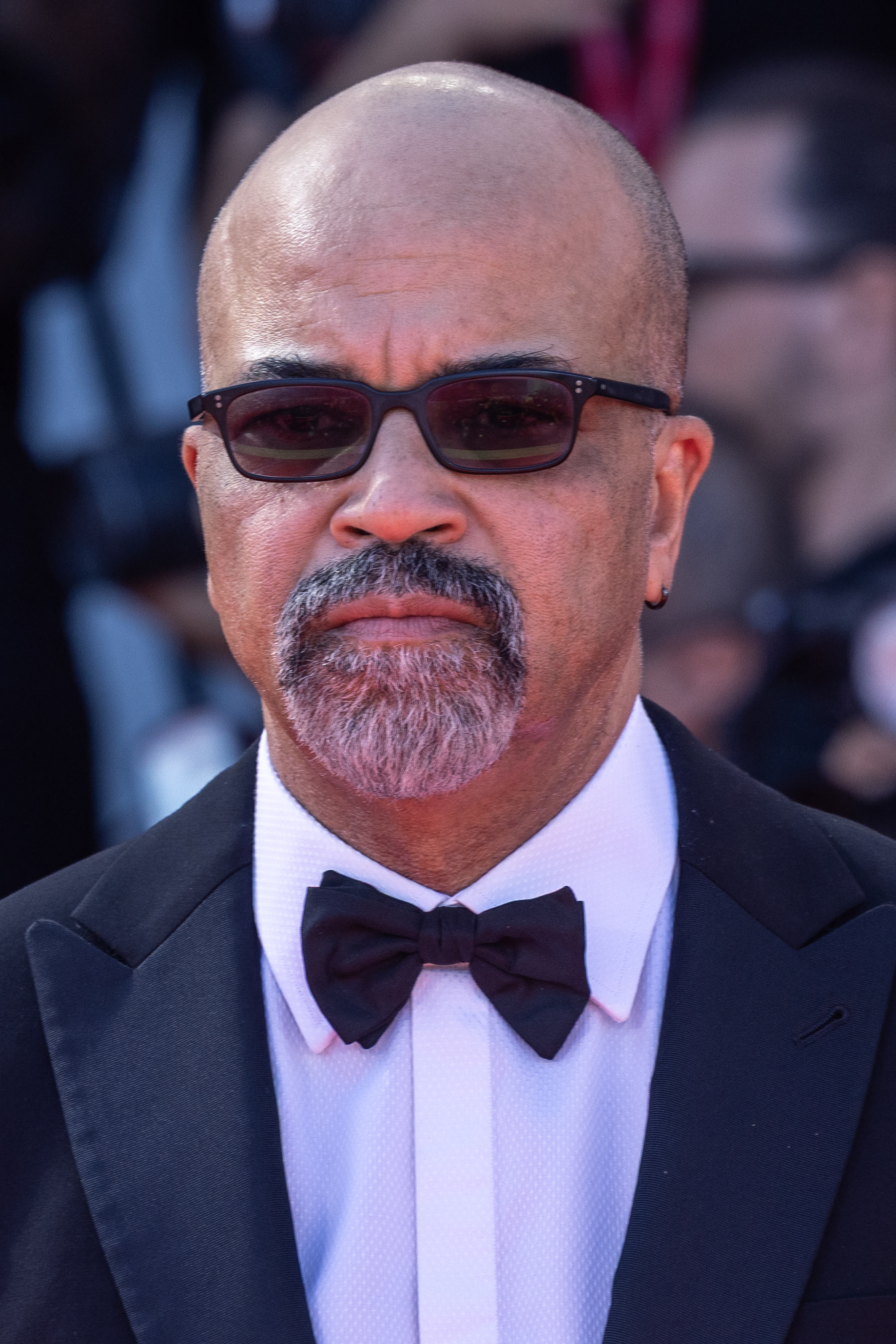
- Wright in 2025
- Born: Jeffrey Charles Wright; December 7, 1965 (age 60); Washington, D.C., U.S.
- Education: Amherst College (BA); New York University (attended)
- Occupation: Actor
- Years active: 1990–present
- Spouse: Carmen Ejogo (m. 2000; div. 2014)
- Children: 2
- Awards: Full list

Jeffrey Charles Wright (born December 7, 1965) is an American actor. His accolades include a British Academy Games Award, a Golden Globe Award, a Primetime Emmy Award, and a Tony Award, in addition to a nomination for an Academy Award.

Wright began his career in theater, where he gained prominence for his role in the Broadway production of Tony Kushner's Angels in America (1993), for which he won a Tony Award for Best Featured Actor in a Play. He reprised his role in the acclaimed HBO miniseries adaptation (2003), earning the Primetime Emmy Award for Outstanding Supporting Actor in a Limited Series or Movie.

His first starring film role was as Jean-Michel Basquiat in Basquiat (1996). His other notable films include Syriana (2005), Lady in the Water (2006), Cadillac Records (2008), The Ides of March (2011), and Rustin (2023). He has also acted in the Wes Anderson films The French Dispatch (2021), Asteroid City (2023) and The Phoenician Scheme (2025), and has played Peoples Hernandez in Shaft (2000), Felix Leiter in the James Bond films Casino Royale (2006), Quantum of Solace (2008), and No Time to Die (2021), Beetee Latier in The Hunger Games films, and Jim Gordon in The Batman (2022). He received a nomination for the Academy Award for Best Actor for his performance in American Fiction (2023).

Wright earned acclaim for his role as Valentin Narcisse in the HBO series Boardwalk Empire (2013–2014) and robot programmer Bernard Lowe in the HBO series Westworld (2016–2022), the latter of which earned him three Primetime Emmy Award nominations. He also appeared as Isaac Dixon in the video game The Last of Us Part II (2020) and the Watcher in the Marvel Cinematic Universe (MCU) beginning with the Disney+ animated series What If...? (2021–2024). In 2025, he voiced the character Chase in the superhero comedy video game Dispatch and reprised his role as Isaac Dixon in the second season of the HBO series adaptation of The Last of Us (2025–present). For the former, he won the British Academy Games Award for Performer in a Supporting Role.

== Early life and education ==
Wright was born on December 7, 1965, in Washington, D.C. His mother is a customs lawyer and his father died when Jeffrey was a child.

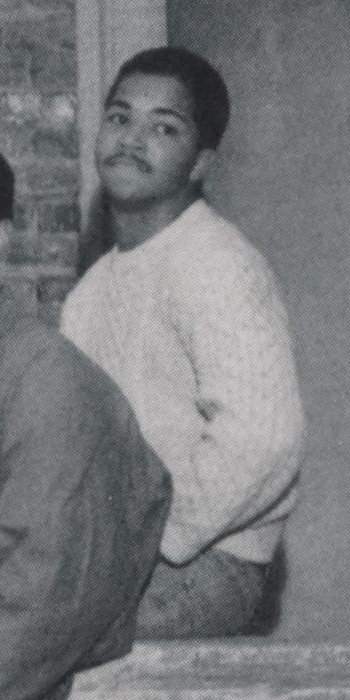
Wright in the Amherst College yearbook, 1986

He graduated from St. Albans School and attended Amherst College, where he received a bachelor's degree in political science with plans to attend law school. However, during his junior year, he was inspired by a friend's performance in an acting class. This prompted him to enroll in that same acting elective the following semester, ultimately leading him to abandon his legal ambitions and pursue a career in acting. He also played lacrosse for Amherst. After attending the MFA acting program at the New York University Tisch School of the Arts for two months in 1988, he left to appear in Les Blancs at Arena Stage before transferring with it to the Huntington Theatre Company and deciding to be an actor full-time.

== Career ==
=== 1990–2003: Theatre roles and Angels in America ===
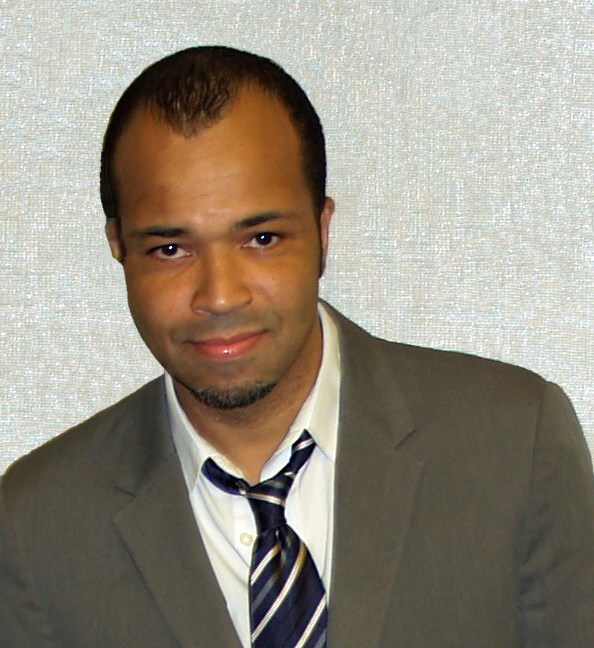
Wright at the Tribeca Film Festival on April 28, 2007

Wright began appearing off-Broadway in New York City and Washington, D.C. In 1990, he appeared in his first major film as an attorney in Alan J. Pakula's legal drama Presumed Innocent. In 1991, he joined John Houseman's national touring repertory company The Acting Company in productions of A Midsummer Night's Dream and Athol Fugard's Blood Knot. In 1993 and 1994, he appeared as Norman "Belize" Arriaga in Tony Kushner's award-winning play Angels in America. His portrayal of a gay nurse forced to take care of Roy Cohn as he dies of AIDS won him the Tony Award for Best Featured Actor in a Play. He also had small roles in the films Jumpin' at the Boneyard (1992), Faithful (1996), and Critical Care (1997).

He guest-starred in George Lucas's The Young Indiana Jones Chronicles as a fictionalized Sidney Bechet and Homicide: Life on the Street in the early to late 1990s. In 1996, Wright starred in his first leading film role, portraying painter Jean-Michel Basquiat in the film Basquiat, to critical acclaim. Critic Roger Ebert praised Wright as "[giving] a performance of almost mystical opacity". For his performance, he earned an Independent Spirit Award for Best Debut Performance nomination. Throughout the 1990s and early 2000s, he appeared in roles in such films as Woody Allen's satirical comedy Celebrity (1998), and Ang Lee's western Ride with the Devil (1999).

In 2000, he starred in three films, Shaft, Hamlet, and Crime and Punishment in Suburbia. He also starred in Clark Johnson's HBO television film Boycott (2001) as Martin Luther King Jr., for which he received an AFI Award. He starred opposite Carmen Ejogo and Terrence Howard. The following year, he portrayed Howard Bingham in Michael Mann's biographical sports drama Ali (2001). The film also starred Will Smith, Jamie Foxx, and Jon Voight. The following year, he returned to Broadway playing Lincoln in the Suzan-Lori Parks play Topdog/Underdog (2002). He starred opposite Mos Def who played Booth. Wright for his performance earned a Tony Award for Best Actor in a Play nomination. In 2003, he reprised his role as Norman "Belize" Arriaga in HBO's award-winning adaptation of Angels in America, garnering him an Primetime Emmy Award for Outstanding Supporting Actor in a Limited or Anthology Series or Movie and a Golden Globe Award for Best Supporting Actor – Series, Miniseries or Television Film.

=== 2004–2015: Established actor ===
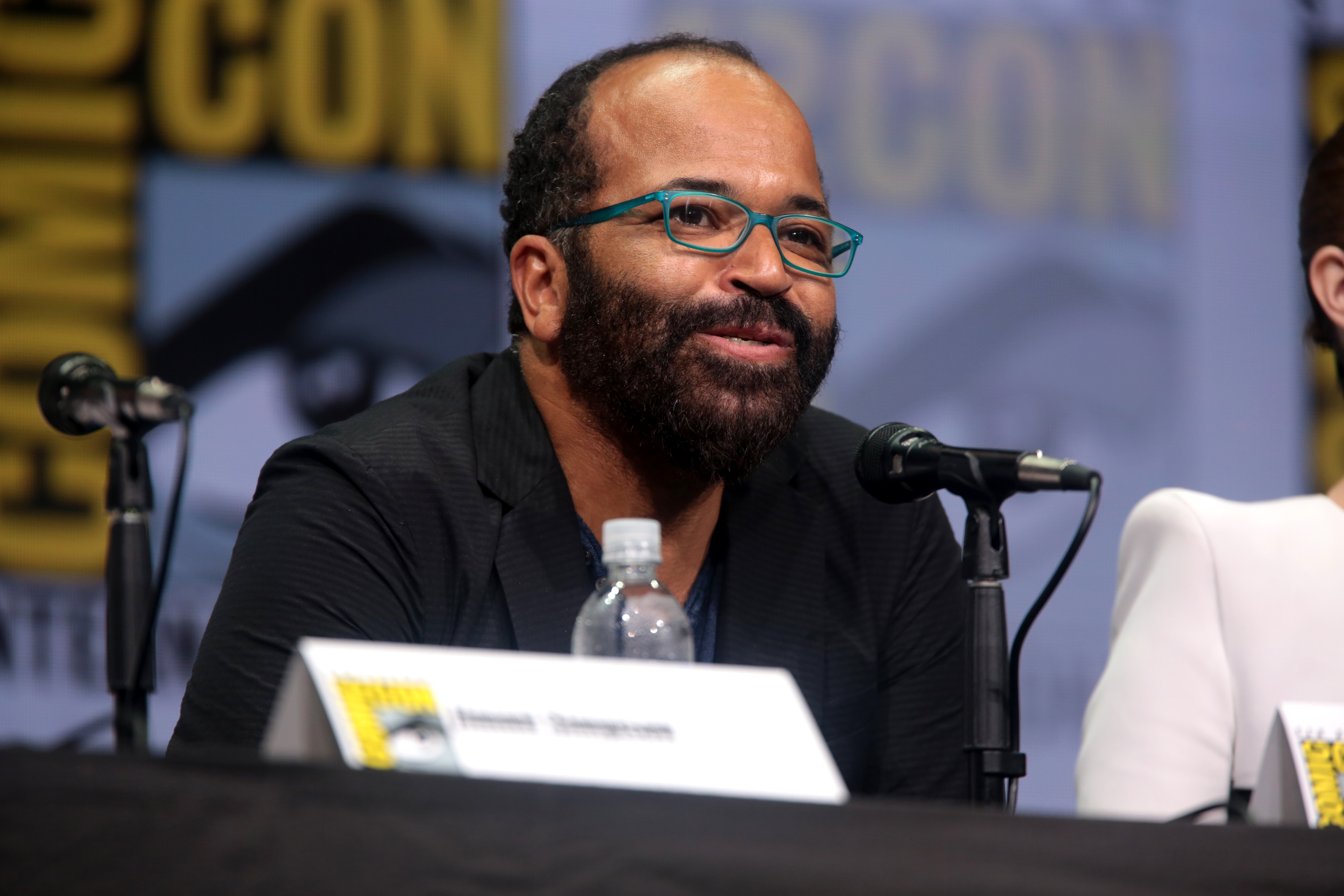
Wright at the 2017 San Diego Comic-Con

In 2004, he appeared in Jonathan Demme's remake of The Manchurian Candidate, starring Meryl Streep and Denzel Washington. In February 2005, Wright returned to HBO Films in Lackawanna Blues. In 2005, he played Washington attorney Bennett Holiday in Syriana and Bill Murray's eccentric Ethiopian neighbor Winston in Broken Flowers, the latter of which earned Wright an Independent Spirit Award for Best Supporting Male nomination. That same year, he also starred in the play This Is How It Goes and appeared as one of the tenants in M. Night Shyamalan's psychological thriller Lady in the Water (2006). In 2006, he appeared as Felix Leiter in the James Bond film Casino Royale. He reprised the role in Quantum of Solace and No Time to Die. In 2007, Wright starred in the alien invasion suspense thriller The Invasion. In 2008, he portrayed Colin Powell in Oliver Stone's biographical drama film W. He portrayed Muddy Waters in Cadillac Records, a biopic, loosely based on the rise and fall of Chess Records.

In 2010, Wright played Jacques Cornet in the world premiere run of A Free Man of Color at the Vivian Beaumont Theater of the Lincoln Center for Performing Arts in New York City. In 2011, he acted in three films: Source Code with Jake Gyllenhaal, Extremely Loud & Incredibly Close starring Tom Hanks and Sandra Bullock, and The Ides of March starring George Clooney. Wright played Beetee in The Hunger Games film series, starting with The Hunger Games: Catching Fire, released in November 2013. He landed the role of Dr. Valentin Narcisse in season 4 of Boardwalk Empire, starting in the fall of 2013. In 2015, he voiced Poppa Henry in the Pixar animated film The Good Dinosaur.

=== 2016–2024: Westworld and American Fiction ===
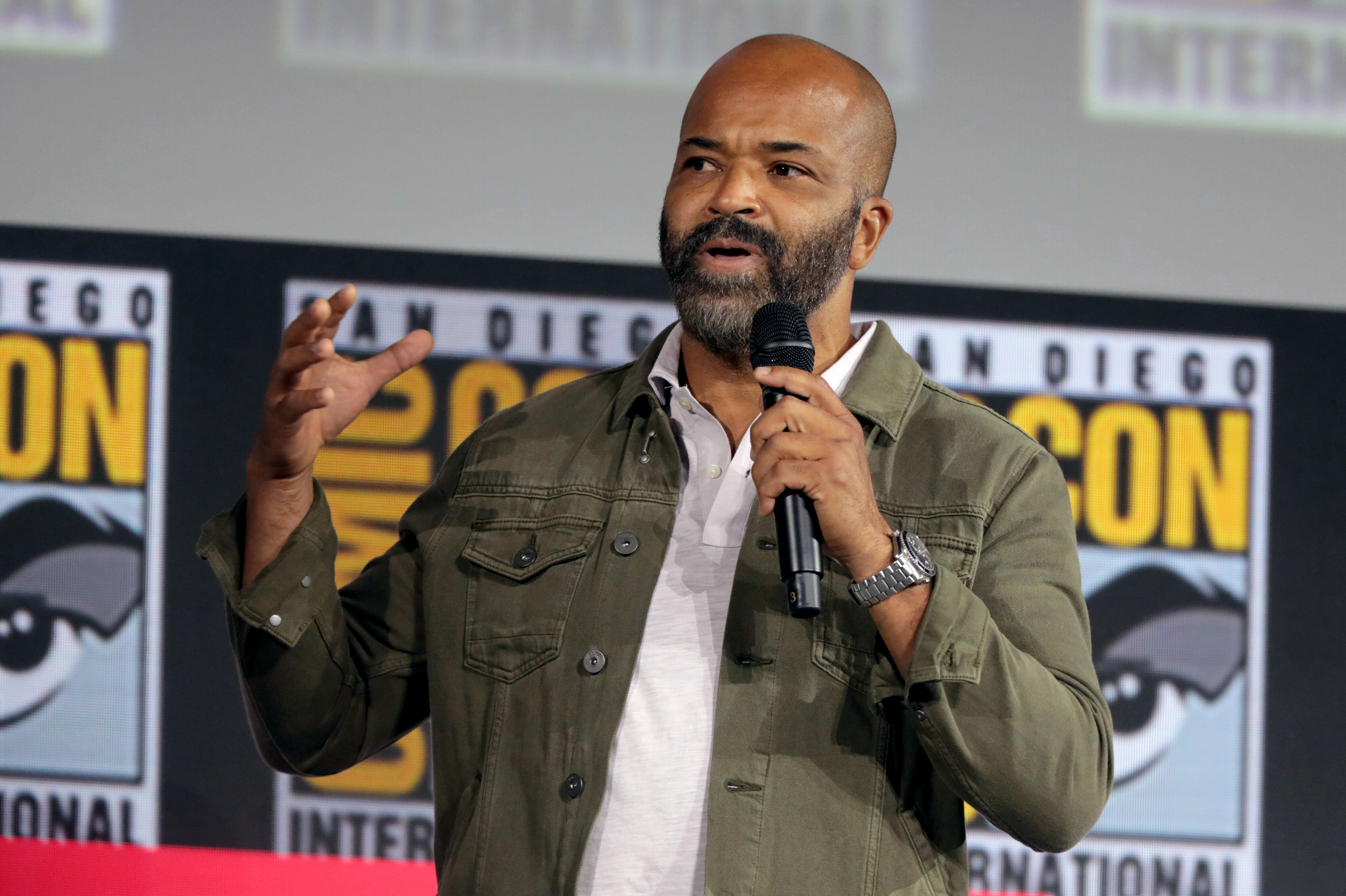
Wright at the 2019 San Diego Comic-Con

He portrayed Charles Ogletree in the HBO film Confirmation (2016), and Bernard Lowe in HBO's Westworld, the latter of which earned him three Primetime Emmy Award nominations. In March 2017, Wright appeared in a commercial for Dell Technologies. In 2018, Wright acted in six feature films including the legal drama Monster, the drama The Public, the action comedy Game Night and the crime drama Age Out. He starred in the HBO film O.G. which was filmed entirely in the Pendleton Correctional Facility. Also, in 2018, he acted in the Netflix action thriller Hold the Dark which premiered at the Toronto International Film Festival.

In 2018, Wright produced the HBO documentary We Are Not Done Yet, which gives voice to war veterans who, through a USO-sponsored arts workshop at Walter Reed National Military Hospital, discover the power and healing of shared experience to unite and find resilience in the face of post-traumatic stress. That same year, Wright starred in HBO's O.G., a film about a man confronting his past crime and preparing to leave prison after decades behind bars. The film was directed by Madeleine Sackler, and was filmed entirely in Pendleton Correctional Facility near Indianapolis, Indiana. The film was shot in a working prison and many prisoners and staff were recruited as actors for the film, including Wright's co-star, Theotus Carter, who plays Beecher, a younger prisoner that Louis, (Wright's character) takes under his wing, which threatens Louis' release date. During shooting, Wright was sometimes mistaken for a prisoner by other real prisoners and guards. The film debuted on HBO on February 25, 2019. Nick Paumgarten of The New Yorker said, "The performances are exceptionally strong, both by the free-to-leave professional actors (especially Jeffrey Wright, who plays Louis, the 'O.G.' of the title, an older inmate on the verge of release) and by the incarcerated neophytes." Ben Kenigsberg of The New York Times said, "Jeffrey Wright gives a rich, imposing performance as the former 'mayor' of Pendleton Correctional Facility."

In 2019, he acted in the Steven Soderbergh directed Netflix comedy-drama The Laundromat starring Meryl Streep, Antonio Banderas, and Gary Oldman. He also acted in John Crowley's drama The Goldfinch starring Nicole Kidman, Sarah Paulson, and Finn Wolfhard. Wright starred in the video game The Last of Us Part II as Isaac, the leader of the Washington Liberation Front. The game was released on June 19, 2020. Wright voices the Watcher in the Disney+ animated series What If...? (2021), which is set in the Marvel Cinematic Universe (MCU).

In 2021, Wright portrayed food writer Roebuck Wright in the film The French Dispatch by Wes Anderson. He reunited with Anderson portraying General Gibson in the 2023 film Asteroid City.

He portrayed Adam Clayton Powell Jr. in the Netflix biographical drama film Rustin and played fictional author Thelonious "Monk" Ellison in the satirical comedy-drama American Fiction both released in 2023. The latter earned him a Golden Globe Award for Best Actor – Motion Picture Musical or Comedy nomination and an Academy Award nomination for Best Actor. Sterling K. Brown was nominated for the Academy Award for Best Supporting Actor for American Fiction, and the nomination of Wright and Brown was the first time a black lead actor and a black supporting actor from the same film were both nominated for Academy Awards.

In 2024, Wright starred in the Showtime series The Agency as Henry Ogletree.

In 2025, Wright voiced the character Chase in the video game Dispatch and reprised his role as Isaac Dixon in the second season of the HBO series adaptation of The Last of Us.

== Personal life ==
Wright married actress Carmen Ejogo in August 2000. They have a son and a daughter and lived in Brooklyn, New York City. They have since divorced.

He is a fan of the Washington Commanders.

In 2004, Wright received an honorary degree from his alma mater Amherst College.

Wright was the chairman and co-founder of the now-defunct Taia, LLC and Taia Peace Foundation and Vice Chairman of Taia Lion Resources, Inc, a gold-exploration company which sought to create a sustainable and conflict-free gold mining operation in Sierra Leone.

== Acting credits ==
=== Film ===
Key
†	Denotes works that have not yet been released

Year	Title	Role	Notes
1990	Presumed Innocent	Prosecuting Attorney	
1992	Jumpin' at the Boneyard	Derek	
1996	Faithful	Young Man	
1996	Basquiat	Jean-Michel Basquiat	
1997	Critical Care	Bed Two	
1998	Too Tired to Die	Balzac Man	
1998	Celebrity	Greg	
1998	Meschugge	Win	
1998	Blossoms and Veils	Ben	
1999	Cement	Ninny	
1999	Ride with the Devil	Daniel Holt	
2000	Hamlet	Gravedigger	
2000	Crime and Punishment in Suburbia	Chris	
2000	Shaft	Peoples Hernandez	
2001	Ali	Howard Bingham	
2002	D-Tox	Jaworski	
2004	Sin's Kitchen	Rex	
2004	The Manchurian Candidate	Al Melvin	
2005	Broken Flowers	Winston	
2005	Syriana	Bennett Holiday	
2006	Lady in the Water	Mr. Dury	
2006	Casino Royale	Felix Leiter	
2007	Chicago 10: Speak Your Peace	Bobby Seale (voice)	
2007	The Invasion	Dr. Stephen Galeano	
2007	Blackout	Nelson	Also producer
2008	W.	Colin Powell	
2008	Quantum of Solace	Felix Leiter	
2008	Cadillac Records	Muddy Waters	
2009	One Blood	Dan Clark	Also producer
2011	Source Code	Dr. Rutledge	
2011	The Ides of March	Senator Thompson	
2011	Extremely Loud & Incredibly Close	William Black	
2013	Broken City	Carl Fairbanks	
2013	A Single Shot	Simon	
2013	The Hunger Games: Catching Fire	Beetee	
2013	The Inevitable Defeat of Mister & Pete	Henry	
2014	Ernest & Celestine	Grizzly Judge (voice)	English dub
2014	Only Lovers Left Alive	Dr. Watson	
2014	The Hunger Games: Mockingjay – Part 1	Beetee	
2015	The Hunger Games: Mockingjay – Part 2	Beetee	Cameo
2015	The Good Dinosaur	Poppa Henry (voice)	
2018	Monster	Mr. Harmon	
2018	The Public	Mr. Anderson	
2018	Game Night	FBI Agent Ron Henderson	Uncredited
2018	Age Out	Detective Portnoy	
2018	O.G.	Louis	
2018	Hold the Dark	Russell Core	
2019	The Laundromat	Malchus Irvin Boncamper	
2019	The Goldfinch	James "Hobie" Hobart	
2019	Rigged: The Voter Suppression Playbook	Narrator	
2020	All Day and a Night	J.D.	
2021	The French Dispatch	Roebuck Wright	
2021	No Time to Die	Felix Leiter	
2022	The Batman	Jim Gordon	
2023	Asteroid City	General Gibson	
2023	Atrabilious	Vincent Daugherty	
2023	Rustin	Adam Clayton Powell Jr.	
2023	American Fiction	Thelonious "Monk" Ellison	
2025	The Phoenician Scheme	Marty	
2025	Highest 2 Lowest	Paul Christopher	
2025	Wake Up Dead Man	Bishop Langstrom	
2025	The Wizard of the Kremlin	Rowland	
2028	The Batman: Part II †	Jim Gordon	Filming
TBA	Samo Lives †		Post-production

=== Television ===
Year	Title	Role	Notes
1991	Separate but Equal	William T. Coleman	Television movie
1993	The Young Indiana Jones Chronicles	Sidney Bechet	2 episodes
1994	New York Undercover	Andre Foreman	Episode: "Garbage"
1997	Homicide: Life on the Street	Hal Wilson	3 episodes
2001	Boycott	Dr. Martin Luther King Jr.	Television movie
2003	Angels in America	Norman "Belize" Arriaga / Mr. Lies / Homeless Man / The Angel Europa	6 episodes
2005	Lackawanna Blues	Mr. Paul	Television movie
2007	American Experience	Narrator	Episode: "New Orleans"
2012	House	Dr. Walter Cofield	Episode: "Nobody's Fault"
2013–2014	Boardwalk Empire	Valentin Narcisse	11 episodes
2016	The Venture Brothers	Think Tank (voice)	Episode: "Tanks for Nuthin"
2016	Confirmation	Charles Ogletree	Television movie
2016	BoJack Horseman	Cuddlywhiskers / Father (voice)	3 episodes
2016–2022	Westworld	Bernard Lowe / Arnold Weber	Main role, 32 episodes
2017	She's Gotta Have It	Purple "ITIS" Voice (voice)	Episode: "#NolasChoice (3 DA HARD WAY)"
2019	Sesame Street	Bernard Lowe	Segment: "Respect World"
2019	Green Eggs and Ham	McWinkle (voice)	13 episodes
2019	Rick and Morty	Tony (voice)	Episode: "The Old Man and the Seat"
2020	Finding Your Roots	Himself	Episode: "This Land is My Land"
2020	The Daily Show with Trevor Noah	Narrator	Episode dated 28 August 2020
2021–2024	What If...?	The Watcher (voice)	Lead role; 26 episodes
2021	Marvel Studios: Assembled	Himself	Episode: The Making of What If...?
2023	I Am Groot	The Watcher (voice)	Episode: "Groot and the Great Prophecy"
2023–2025	Digman!	Uncle Christ (voice)	2 episodes
2024	Ark: The Animated Series	Henry Townsend (voice)	3 episodes
2024–present	The Agency	Henry Ogletree	Main role
2025–present	The Last of Us	Isaac Dixon	Guest (season 2); Recurring role (season 3)

=== Theater ===
Year	Title	Role	Author	Venue
1993	Angels in America: Millennium Approaches	Belize / Mr. Lies	Tony Kushner	Walter Kerr Theatre, Broadway
1993	Angels in America: Perestroika	Belize / Mr. Lies / Council of Principalities	Tony Kushner	Walter Kerr Theatre, Broadway
1996	Bring in 'da Noise, Bring in 'da Funk	Da Voice	Reg E. Gaines	Ambassador Theatre, Broadway
2002	Topdog/Underdog	Lincoln	Suzan-Lori Parks	Ambassador Theatre, Broadway
2010	A Free Man of Color	Jacques Cornet	John Guare	Vivian Beaumont Theatre, Broadway

=== Video games ===
Year	Title	Role	Notes
2020	The Last of Us Part II	Isaac Dixon	Voice and motion capture
2025	Dispatch	Chase / Track Star / Starblazer	Voice

=== Audio ===
Year	Title	Role	Production company	Notes
2021	The Sandman: Act II	Destiny	Audible	
2021	Batman: The Audio Adventures	Bruce Wayne/Batman	Blue Ribbon Content	

== See also ==
- African-American Tony nominees and winners
- List of black Academy Award winners and nominees
- List of actors with Academy Award nominations
- List of Primetime Emmy Award winners
- List of Golden Globe winners

Preceded by David Hedison	Felix Leiter actor 2006 – 2021	Incumbent
Preceded by Ben McKenzie	Commissioner Gordon actor 2021 – present	Incumbent
