= O Horizon =

2025 science fiction film by Madeleine Sackler

- Theatrical release poster
- Directed by: Madeleine Sackler
- Written by: Madeleine Sackler
- Produced by: Audrey Tommassini Cross; Joseph Cross; Paul Nelson
- Starring: Maria Bakalova; David Strathairn; Adam Pally
- Edited by: Pablo Barbieri Carrera
- Music by: Nathaniel Méchaly
- Production company: Great Curve Films
- Distributed by: Variance Films
- Release dates: February 8, 2025 (SBIFF); June 12, 2026 (United States)
- Running time: 107 minutes
- Country: United States
- Language: English
- Box office: $16,421

O Horizon is a 2025 American sci-fi comedy drama film written and directed by Madeleine Sackler. It stars Maria Bakalova as Abby, a gifted neuroscientist who uses her career to bury the grief over her recently deceased father. David Strathairn plays her late father Warren, and Adam Pally is Sam, a computer programmer who helps Abby reconnect with her father.

The film premiered at the 40th Santa Barbara International Film Festival on February 8, 2025 and was released in the United States on June 12, 2026.

== Plot ==
Abby, a brilliant, young neuroscientist who has recently lost her father Warren, drowns her grief by spending her days working with a monkey named Dorey. Abby meets a programmer, Sam, who has created a technology that reconnects Abby with her beloved father. Her relationship with her digitized dad then forces her to re-examine everything from her romantic relationships to her life's work.

== Cast ==
- Maria Bakalova as Abby
- David Strathairn as Warren
- Adam Pally as Sam
- Maggie Grace
- Avi Nash
- Paulina Porizkova

== Production ==
In January 2023, it was announced that Madeleine Sackler would be directing O Horizon from a script she wrote, with Maria Bakalova and David Strathairn leading the cast. Later that month, it was announced that Adam Pally would also star in the film. Production wrapped in the fall of 2022.

In January 2023, Artnet reported that the film's storyline sparked objections with some of its crew, who felt uncomfortable with how closely it resembled Sackler's relationship with her own father, Jonathan Sackler, who died of cancer in 2020, and how it portrayed him in a good light. She was previously also criticized for not denouncing her family's company Purdue Pharma, infamous for its role in the opioid epidemic. One crew member allegedly quit work on the production. Sackler was clear in her denial of the allegations, "This film is about artificial intelligence and there are no parallels between my father or his work and the characters in the film."

== Release ==
The film premiered at the 40th Santa Barbara International Film Festival on February 8, 2025. It was released in the United States on June 12, 2026.
