= The Lottery (2010 film) =

2010 film

- Official movie poster
- Directed by: Madeleine Sackler
- Produced by: Blake Ashman; Todd Bartels; Erin Lanuti; James Lawler; Madeleine Sackler
- Cinematography: Wolfgang Held
- Edited by: Madeleine Sackler
- Music by: Tunde Adebimpe; Gerard Smith
- Production company: Great Curve Films
- Distributed by: Variance Films
- Release dates: 27 March 2010 (Cleveland); 7 May 2010 (United States)
- Running time: 81 minutes
- Country: United States
- Language: English
- Box office: $54,543

The Lottery is a 2010 documentary film about the controversy surrounding public and charter schools in the United States, directed by Madeleine Sackler. The film was produced by Blake Ashman-Kipervaser, James Lawler, and Madeleine Sackler. The cinematographer was Wolfgang Held (Brüno, Metallica: Some Kind of Monster, Children Underground).

== Synopsis ==
The film follows four families from Harlem and the Bronx in the months leading up to the lottery for one of the Success Academy Charter Schools (then known as Harlem Success Academy), one of the most successful charter schools in New York City. The film explores the debate surrounding the education reform movement. The film highlights the opposition from the teachers' unions to charter schools (as they are usually not unionized), and the contest between charter and public schools for building space.

== Participants ==
- Geoffrey Canada: the president and CEO of Harlem Children's Zone, which The New York Times Magazine called "one of the most ambitious social experiments of our time."
- Cory Booker: the mayor of Newark, New Jersey. He is a member of numerous boards and advisory committees that are committed to education.
- Candice Fryer: a teacher at Harlem Success Academy 2 (now known as Success Academy Harlem 2).
- Betsy Gotbaum: New York City Public Advocate from 2001 to 2009.
- Meredith Gotlin: the Principal of PS29 in the Bronx.
- Joel Klein: the New York City School Chancellor from 2002 to January 2011.
- Jim Manly: the Principal of Harlem Success Academy 2.
- Eva Moskowitz: the founder and CEO of Success Academy Charter Schools (then known as Success Charter Network), which runs the Success Academies Harlem.
- Jessica Reid: a teacher at Harlem Success Academy 2 (now known as Success Academy Harlem 2).
- Susan Taylor: editor in chief of Essence Magazine from 1981 to 2000. She founded the National CARES Mentoring Movement, whose goal is to recruit one million adult mentors.
- Dacia Toll: the president and co-CEO of Achievement First, which runs seventeen charter schools in Connecticut and New York.
- Paul Tough: an editor at The New York Times Magazine and the author of Whatever It Takes: Geoffrey Canada's Quest to Change Harlem and America.

== Production ==
Sackler, a graduate of Duke University, said she was inspired to make the film by news footage of a charter-school lottery at the Harlem Armory in 2008. This is her first film project.

== Distribution ==
It was shown at the Tribeca Film Festival in April 2010, as part of the "Tribeca Talks" panel.

The Lottery was released in cinemas on 7 May 2010, and on DVD on 30 May 2010.

== Reception ==
Frank Scheck of the Hollywood Reporter noted that the film is "hardly objective in its stance", but said that it would be "of vital interest to anyone interested in the topic." Errol Louis in the New York Daily News compared it to An Inconvenient Truth, arguing that it "will create and energize charter supporters by the thousands."

== See also ==
- Waiting for "Superman"
