= New Heights Academy Charter School =

Public school in New York City

Coordinates: 40.828615°N 73.945396°W

New Heights Academy Charter School (M353) is a charter school in Harlem, New York City, New York for grades 5 - 12, located at 1818 Amsterdam Avenue. It is within the New York City Department of Education.

The students originate from Harlem, the Bronx, Inwood, and Washington Heights.

New Heights Academy Charter School was founded in 2006 for students in grades 5-12 living in Harlem, Washington Heights and Inwood. Washington Heights in particular was lacking in high school options for students entering 9th grade, so the opening of New Heights provided these students with the opportunity to attend high school in their own neighborhood.

As of 2011 it was the largest charter school in New York City.

== History ==
New Heights Academy received its initial charter in 2005. Committed to locating the school in District 6 where the majority of students and their families live, the founding team delayed opening the school for one year until space was found for the school in District 6. In 2006 New Heights Academy opened its doors in a landmarked former ribbon factory, 'Fair and Square' Ribbons manufactured by Joseph Loth & Co., to 192 fifth and ninth graders. Each year New Heights Academy added an additional grade in both middle school and high school, reaching full enrollment of 750 students in 2009. In June 2010, New Heights held its inaugural high school graduation. Stacy Winitt is the founder of New Heights Academy Charter School.

== Operations ==
As of 2015 the school's board of trustees includes representatives of Bingham McCutchen, Goldman Sachs, NRG Energy, PricewaterhouseCoopers, Time Warner, and other major companies. Alan J. Singer, author of Education Flashpoints: Fighting for America’s Schools, stated that the resources given by the board was one of the reasons attributed to the school's "apparent success". Stacy Winitt was the founder and inaugural Executive Director. Christina Brown next served as Executive Director, followed by Karen Valbrun who resigned as ED on August 3, 2026, so NHACS is currently seeking an Executive Director.

== Academics ==
Charter schools are public schools which receive public funds though operate independently from local school boards. New Heights Academy is accountable to the SUNY Charter Schools Institute and the charter is up for renewal every three-five years. Students at New Heights Academy are selected through a lottery system and are eligible to begin attending New Heights as fifth graders. Upon successful completion of middle school requirements, students are promoted to New Heights Academy High School.

New Heights Academy High School has many similarities to other New York City public high schools. Students at New Heights take Regents exams in all of their core subjects. New Heights also offers Advanced Placement courses, including AP Calculus AB, AP English Language and Composition, AP English Literature and Composition, AP United States History, AP Italian, and AP Psychology. Students at New Heights, however, follow an extended day schedule, with school beginning at 8:20 am and ending at 4:14 pm (though on Wednesdays students have a half day schedule and staff members have professional development in the afternoon). All students at New Heights study a college-preparatory curriculum and must successfully complete a 4 year sequence in English, History, Mathematics and Science (most NYC high schools have only a 3 year STEM requirement).

Saturday Academy exists to support students in their core classes, as well as provide additional preparation for Regents and Advanced Placement examinations. Some students are required to attend the Saturday Academy to get extra help in schoolwork and to make up incomplete work for their classes, since the school has a current high school grading policy in which one missed assignment in a class results in an automatic 55 for the quarter in that class.

Students in grades 9, 10 and 11 have the option to take Japanese language classes. Founder Stacy Winitt stated that the school wants students to be more marketable by knowing more languages, and the school selected Japanese since it is an unfamiliar language to the majority Hispanic student body.

== College Preparation ==
The college curriculum and preparation differentiates New Heights Academy from most public high schools. OneGoal, a program focused on college graduation for urban students, is an integral part of Advisory. Initially, there was a single OneGoal class in 11th grade, and selected students had GPAs ranging from 75-85 and excellent attendance records. These students received additional mentorship and support as the designated OneGoal class, beginning in 11th grade, continuing in 12th grade and following them through their first year of college. Due to the success of the OneGoal program, New Heights Academy made the decision to expand it, and now the OneGoal curriculum is implemented in all 11th and 12th grade Advisory classes, in which students explore different colleges, learn about the college application process, apply to college and create their own personal post-secondary pathway. Teachers with several years of classroom experience and strong relationships with students are selected as OneGoal Program Directors, and they remain with their OneGoal classes for three consecutive years.

All high school students at New Heights go on trips to visit colleges. In 9th grade students take day trips to visit local CUNY and private colleges, in 10th grade students visit colleges in upstate New York on an overnight trip, and during 11th grade students attend a week long, overnight, out-of-state college trip. As seniors students receive extensive guidance and support in applying to a total of fifteen CUNYs, SUNYs and private colleges. 100% of New Heights seniors are accepted into college. Notable colleges students attend include Cornell, Barnard, University of Rochester, NYU, Boston University, RIT, Gettysburg, Wheaton, SUNY Stony Brook, SUNY Binghamton, CUNY Baruch College and CUNY Hunter College.

== Academic Performance ==
Circa 2014 NYCDOE school assessment personnel ranked this school an "A" school for the 2010-2011 progress report.

As of circa 2020, 24% performed at grade level in mathematics and 21% performed at or above grade level in reading. The incoming class at that time had a higher reading score than the students already established at New Heights.

The NYCDOE stated that the school's graduation rate was 81% while the school stated that 90% of the original 12th grade class graduated. Singer wrote that the NYCDOE rate was "still very high given the student population." According to City University of New York college tests proctored around 2014, 1.1% of students graduating from New Heights were prepared to do university-level work without remedial classes. Since then this percentage has gone down.

== Student body ==
As of 2020 the majority of the students are Hispanic. 95% of the students qualified for free or reduced lunch, an indicator of low income status.

It had 192 students in 2006 and 760 students by fall 2011.

== Athletics ==
Athletic offerings abound at New Heights High School, including the following:

- Volleyball
- Soccer
- Basketball
- Baseball
- Softball
- Cheerleading

== Extracurricular Activities ==
New Heights students can get involved in the following activities:

- National Honor Society
- Creative Writing Club
- Yearbook
- Band
- Theatre
- Dance Team
