= Pendleton Correctional Facility =

Prison in Pendleton, Indiana

Coordinates: 39°58′59″N 85°45′37″W

- Interactive map of Pendleton Correctional Facility
- Location: 4490 W Reformatory Road Pendleton, Indiana
- Status: open
- Security class: mixed
- Capacity: 1650
- Opened: 1923
- Managed by: Indiana Department of Correction

The Pendleton Correctional Facility, formerly known as the Indiana Reformatory, is a state prison located in Fall Creek Township, Madison County, near Pendleton and about 25 miles (40 km) northeast of Indianapolis. Established in 1923, it was built to replace the Indiana State Reformatory located in Jeffersonville after a fire severely damaged the original property. The Pendleton facility currently offers maximum and minimum-security housing for adult males over 22 years old. The maximum-security portion is made up of 31 acres (130,000 m^{2}) surrounded by a concrete wall. It has an average daily population of approximately 1,650 inmates. Located on the grounds outside the enclosure, the minimum-security dormitory holds approximately 200 prisoners on a daily basis.

== History ==
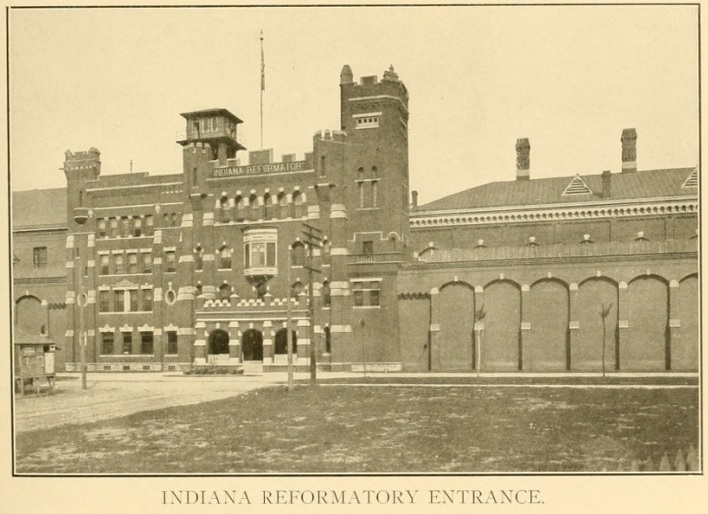
Entrance to the Indiana Reformatory, 1909

Indiana's first state prison was authorized on January 9, 1821, and opened in October 1822 in Jeffersonville. The prison, later called Indiana State Prison South, accepted inmates regardless of age, sex, offense, or sentence. In 1847, the prison buildings were in poor repair and the decision was made that it would be built a new in nearby Clarksville. Another prison opened in the northern part of the state in Michigan City, Indiana, and the inmates were divided between the two. In 1897, inmates were divided by age between the South and North. The Indiana State Prison South became home to inmates age 16 to 30 and the Michigan City prison was renamed the Indiana Reformatory.

During the night of February 6, 1918, a fire severely damaged one-third of the buildings at the Indiana Reformatory. The governor appointed a commission to look into building a new prison in a more centrally located site. A plot of land south of the city of Pendleton was selected because Fall Creek provided a source of running water. The construction commenced at the new locale during March 1922.

Herbert W. Folz was the architect in charge of designing the new prison. The facility is an "example of a 'radial plan' prison, in which the cell blocks fan out from a central point." According to a report on the Reformatory, Folz "made a conscious effort to arrange the buildings within the enclosure in such a manner that a maximum of light and air and green grass would be in evidence." The buildings were modeled after the Spanish Colonial Revival style. The original facilities included three cell houses, a dormitory, and the administration building.

Construction on the prison continued until early 1924 when A. F. Miles, the superintendent, ended the contracts with the architect and other contractors. He proposed completing construction on the prison using inmates as the laborers. Miles organized the prisoners into groups, with each group concentrating on a specific aspect of the work. Each of these specialty groups was assigned to a professional in the field who would provide them guidance in learning the craft. Some of the tasks inmates participated in included bricklaying, plumbing, roofing, electrical work, and painting. By switching to inmate labor, Miles quickly decreased the labor costs from $61,000 to $4,500.

In June 1996, the Indiana General Assembly passed House Enrolled Act 1229 which changed the name of the Indiana Reformatory. Put into effect on July 1, 1996, the Indiana Reformatory was officially named the Pendleton Correctional Facility.

In 2017, American filmmaker Madeleine Sackler created two films filmed entirely in the Pendleton Correctional Facility. One is a fictional drama titled O.G. and the second is a cinéma vérité-style documentary called It's a Hard Truth Ain't It.

== Major Incidents ==
=== Riot ===
On February 1, 1985, a riot took place at the Pendleton Correctional Facility, then still known as the Indiana Reformatory. An inmate, Lincoln Love, who also referred to himself as Lokmar Yazid Abdul Wadood and died in 2020 while serving a sentence for involvement with the riot, was badly beaten by correctional officers after he refused to vacate his cell during a weapons check, also called a shakedown. Tear gas was used in large quantities in the cellblock, although eyewash was only offered to the officers. Inmates John Cole and Christopher Trotter rushed to the maximum restraint unit where the beating had taken place. The two proceeded to the infirmary where Love was located and attacked the officers in that area. They held staff hostage when they took over the J-Cellhouse. After the riot was over, inmates had stabbed seven correctional officers and held three employees hostage for 17 hours.

In the court cases stemming from the riot, testimony was given by one of the stabbed officers, Michael Richardson. Under oath Michael claims that Love had been targeted, or had been a convenient target, for refusing to leave his cell during the search even though he had no weapon. Michael claims that Love's targeting was the result of racial tensions between the almost exclusively white correctional officer staff and majority black population of the time. Michael claims there were multiple white supremacist groups operating among the guards, most predominately a KKK splinter group called the "Sons of Light".

=== 1988–2011 ===
In 1988, the superintendent of the Indiana Reformatory, Edward L. Cohn, was reprimanded for shackling inmates in manners that violated current prison standards. Inmates were shackled in a position that allowed them neither to stand up nor lay straight. This position is achieved by placing handcuffs around an inmates wrists and connecting them to leg irons with a short chain. One prisoner was kept in a maximum-restraint unit in this position for seven days, not even being allowed to loosen his shackles to eat or to use the bathroom. On another occasion, seven inmates wearing only underwear were placed in a single room. After two of the inmates were removed, the remaining five were put in restraints consistent with those mentioned in the previous incidents for one day. These were not the only cases of illegal restraints being used on prisoners. As a result of these incidents, Superintendent Cohn was placed on paid leave for approximately three months. Cohn lost "30 days worth of pay and a merit raise." His two assistants were suspended for a number days without pay, denied their merit raises, and required to undergo performance evaluations quarterly instead of annually. In later years Edward L. Cohn went on to become the Commissioner of the Indiana Department of Correction.

In 1990, Pendleton came under fire for allowing an unsafe environment for inmates after two prisoners were fatally stabbed within a two-week period. Jesus Rodriquez #856496 was killed while he was in the segregation unit and Samuel Miller #906085 was murdered the day after he was released from the same unit.

Two separate incidents involving sexual misconduct between employees and inmates brought to light in 2001. The first occurred on December 8 of the previous year. An inmate and a female nurse were caught on camera engaging in a sexual act in a closet. The cameras were in place to record possible tobacco trafficking believed to have been occurring in the closet. Clips of the tape from the camera were shown often on the news during the scandal. In the second case, a female guard accused an inmate of inappropriately touching her. It was later revealed that she had consensual sex with an inmate in a hallway.

On May 1, 2004, an unidentified caller phoned the Pendleton Correctional Facility about plans of assaults and escape attempts by the inmates. The phone call occurred at a time during which prisoners had set up an eight-step action plan. This plan asked inmates to "boycott recreation periods on some days, submit grievances about food portions, visitation privileges, and law library access, and pick days when everyone in a cell house would show up for breakfast, which is optional." The phone call, in addition to increasing inmate on inmate violence, prompted the then-Superintendent Zettie Cotton to impose a lockdown on the prison. During the lockdown, brown bag lunches were served, classes were not allowed to meet, and visiting hours were cut down. The lockdown lasted a total of five months, one of the longest in recent years of any prison in Indiana.

On October 9, 2008, at 12:39 a.m. during a routine security check, convicted killer Simon Rios was found hanging in his cell. Attempts to resuscitate him were unsuccessful and he was pronounced dead at 1:20 a.m. Rios was convicted in October 2007 for the murder of his three children and his wife in Fort Wayne, Indiana in December 2005. He also was convicted of raping and killing 10-year-old Alejandra Gutierrez. Rios was serving a total of 5 life-terms plus 50 years for the rape and molestation of Alejandra Gutierrez.

On January 25, 2010, 52-year-old offender Charles L Jackson was stabbed by another inmate shortly before 1:30 Saturday as offenders were being released to go to recreation. Jackson, who previously lived in Marion, was transported to the facility's emergency room, where he was pronounced dead about 45 minutes later. Jackson had been sentenced to 80 years for rape in Grant County.

On May 28, 2011, Timothy Knapp was stabbed around 1:45 p.m. Saturday in a segregation unit. Officers rushed the victim to the in-house health care center where less than an hour later he was pronounced dead. Knapp had been serving a three-year sentence for an arson conviction in Marion County.

On July 16, 2011, Daniel Dewitt was attacked by two offenders around 6:30 a.m. Saturday when the offenders, all housed in the facility's "H" cell house, were being released to the gym for recreation. The offenders stabbed Dewitt several times in an act of gang violence and he was pronounced dead at a local hospital hours later. Dewitt was six months into a 17-year sentence for dealing in a controlled substance and a ten-year sentence for being a felon in possession of a firearm.

== Notable Inmates ==
- John Dillinger, the notorious bank robber and one of the prison's most famous inmates, was sent to the Indiana State Reformatory at Pendleton in the mid-1920s. In September 1924, Dillinger and a friend robbed a grocery store in Mooresville, Indiana. While the grocer was not seriously hurt, Dillinger did beat him with an iron belt wrapped in cloth. His sentencing of 10–20 years was the maximum sentence one could receive for the crime. While at Pendleton, Dillinger worked in the shirt factory at the facility and often succeeded in doubling his quota. After his wife, Beryl, divorced him and he was denied parole in 1929, Dillinger requested and was granted a transfer to the State Prison at Michigan City, Indiana. After he was finally granted parole in May 1933, he continued his storied escapades around the Mid-West until he was shot and killed on July 22, 1934.
- Richard Hobbs, Coy Hubbard, and John Baniszewski Jr
- Jim Ligon – sentenced for three years there due to "assault and battery with intent to gratify sexual desires" after playing with the Harlem Magicians while directly out of high school; later became an All-Star player for the American Basketball Association during the 1969 ABA All-Star Game despite going undrafted as a player due to his stint in prison.
- Richard Matthew Allen - perpetrator of the 2017 Delphi Murders, left Indiana in July 2025 to serve his sentence at Lexington Assessment and Reception Center in Lexington, Oklahoma after spending time at Pendleton and Westville.
- Benjamin Jackson - former Columbus Township Trustee.
