= Therapeutic Crisis Intervention =

Crisis management protocol

Therapeutic Crisis Intervention, also known as the abbreviation TCI, is a crisis management protocol developed by Cornell University for residential child care facilities. The purpose of the TCI protocol is to provide a crisis prevention and intervention model for residential child care facilities which will assist them in:

- Preventing crises from occurring,
- de-escalating potential crises,
- effectively managing acute crisis phases,
- reducing potential and actual injury to children and staff,
- teaching constructive ways to handle stressful situations, and
- developing a learning circle within the organization.

The protocol was developed beginning in 1979, through funding from a grant by the National Center on Child Abuse and Neglect.

A review by the Social Care Institute for Excellence found only two rigorous evaluations of Therapeutic Crisis Intervention (TCI) have been conducted, and these studies presented mixed conclusions as to its effectiveness.

TCI training may also include staff education on different methods of restraining individuals who are at risk of injuring themselves or others.
