= Julia Lang (entrepreneur) =

Tanzanian German entrepreneur and creative director (born 1989)

- Born: Julia Miriam Lang; 3 September 1986 (age 40); Kilimanjaro, Tanzania
- Education: Bachelor of Trade and Commerce
- Alma mater: University of Erlangen–Nuremberg
- Occupations: creative director; serial entrepreneur
- Years active: 2009 - present
- Organization: VEERT
- Website: Instagram

Julia Lang is a German-Tanzanian creative director, image consultant and entrepreneur. She is the founder of unisex lifestyle brand, VEERT.

== Background and education ==
Lang was born in Machame, Kilimanjaro, Tanzania in East Africa to German parents. She moved back to Germany when she was four years old, alongside her family. Her parents were missionaries. She earned her first degree in Trade & Commerce in 2009 from University of Erlangen–Nuremberg, Germany.

== Career ==
After earning her bachelor's degree in Nuremberg, Germany, Lang went to New York to work as an intern at a small marketing firm for three months in 2009. After her internship, she moved back to Germany, and then to London. She would later move to Berlin, where she started her career by opening her own marketing agency in 2012. She worked with corporations and small-business brands alike, pushing their brands primarily on social media, mainstream media and other outlets, media and platforms.

In 2015, she received an O-1 Visa and relocated to New York. In an interview with Forbes, she described this as giving her the freedom to work for herself, and "not be tied to anyone" while working and living in the USA. Explaining that the Visa gave her the opportunity to move to the USA through her abilities and not through "a relationship or tied to a company". She heads three companies. Her marketing agency has business execs and athletes amongst its clientele and one of her clients was Kareem Burke, who became a client of hers from 2017 to 2019 after an elevator pitch; within which time she and Kareem "Biggs" Burke launched the Nike Roc-A-Fella Air Force 1's with and traveled the world together.

=== VEERT ===
She founded her company, VEERT, in 2020. It was launched during the COVID-19 pandemic, and co-founded by Leontinus Arnolds. The word Veert is a stylization of the French word vert, which means green. As such, the accessories are acknowledged for each piece having a touch of green as a brand signature. Lang became a fashion influencer too as a result. VEERT went on to gain success, recognition and subsequent endorsements from tastemakers, ranging from Miguel, who expressly approved the brand to Alicia Keys, The Weeknd, Meek Mill, Winnie Harlow, Giveon, Stephen Curry, Swizz Beats, Brett Gelman, J-Hope of BTS, Westside Gunn, Maluma, Bryson Tiller, Brad Pitt and Nas. The jewelry was sold in SSENSE, The Webster, Saks Fifth Avenue and Selfridges. The brand has given Lang the opportunity to attend and take part in the fashion weeks in Milan and Paris. The brand focuses on unisex fashion, the genderless fashion movement. And it includes sterling silver, 18K gold and gemstones, emphasizing on inclusivity, positive energy and healing. When the brand launched in New York, it focused on the E-commerce space and subsequently found its way into jewelry stores. It has a style that encompasses gemstones like green onyx, peridot, malachite and zirconia stones within 18K solid gold and 18K gold vermeil chains. These are believed the heal the heart chakra, bring positive energy and take away negative energy, according to pseudoscience. It is believed to also help one press on from all types of sorrow, depression and grief, find love, affection, and friendship, and alleviate stress, worries, fears and tension. According to The New Zealand Herald, VEERT jewelry has the feel of a luxury but yet contemporary item, as is associated with Italian and French heritage brands. In an interview with Rolling stone, she explains that the brand focuses on intertwining and integrating both male female fashion together and also marrying both old and modern fashion statements, incorporating legacy female fashion pieces like the freshwater pearl into modern male fashion, and involving simplicity and recyclability. She said in the interview, "we want to be the catalyst of empowerment, healing energy, and unity". They have been five collections released. As a way to celebrate the brand's 1-year anniversary, an exclusive limited-edition jewelry collection was offered on Instagram in 2021 by VEERT. An Instagram live was hosted to mark the event which had in attendance celebrity guests Swizz Beatz, Westside Gunn, Vic Mensa, and host Dennis Todisco, who is the head of the sneaker and streetwear partnerships at Instagram. The collection was a Four-piece unisex collection including a Macro 3-D Logo Necklace, a Micro 3-D Logo Necklace, a Micro 3-D Logo Bracelet and a Gold Plated Kama Sutra Leaf Porcelain Bowl; all featuring a 18k gold vermeil base.

== Personal life ==
She has a song named after her released by rapper Westside Gunn. She was on the cover of Page magazine print issue, November 2022 and Le Mile's April 2022 Global print cover of their 10-year anniversary.
