= Opportunity Charter School =

Public school in New York City

Coordinates: 40.8018°N 73.95547°W

- Harlem, Manhattan, New York City, New York; United States

Information
- School type: Charter school
- Established: 2004; 22 years ago
- Grades: 6-12
- Enrollment: c.400
- Website: www.opportunitycharter.org

Opportunity Charter School is a free public charter school in the Harlem neighborhood of the New York City borough of Manhattan. It serves approximately 400 students in grades 6–12. It was chartered by the New York State Board of Regents in 2004. The charter school serves disabled and academically struggling students. A fight to renew its charter was won in 2011 with a two-year renewal granted and the school's website reported a five-year renewal in 2012.

== See also ==
- List of high schools in New York City
