= O.G. (film) =

2018 film directed by Madeleine Sackler

- Film poster
- Directed by: Madeleine Sackler
- Written by: Stephen Belber
- Produced by: Stephen Belber; Ged Dickersin; Nick Gordon; Boyd Holbrook; Trevor Matthews; Madeleine Sackler; Trudie Styler; Celine Rattray
- Starring: Jeffrey Wright; William Fichtner; Boyd Holbrook; Mare Winningham; David Patrick Kelly; Yul Vazquez
- Cinematography: Wolfgang Held
- Edited by: Frédéric Thoraval
- Music by: Nathaniel Méchaly
- Production companies: Great Curve Films; Brookstreet Pictures
- Distributed by: HBO
- Release dates: April 20, 2018 (Tribeca Film Festival); February 23, 2019 (United States)
- Running time: 113 minutes
- Country: United States
- Language: English

O.G. is a 2018 American drama film directed by Madeleine Sackler and written by Stephen Belber. The film stars Jeffrey Wright, William Fichtner, Boyd Holbrook, Mare Winningham, David Patrick Kelly and Yul Vazquez. The film premiered on HBO on February 23, 2019. The film was entirely filmed in Pendleton Correctional Facility, a maximum security (Level 4) prison in Indiana.

== Plot ==
The film follows the story of a man preparing to reenter civilian life after 26 years in prison. He must choose between his own freedom and the opportunity to protect a younger fellow inmate.

== Cast ==
- Jeffrey Wright as Louis
- William Fichtner as Danvers
- Boyd Holbrook as Pinkins
- Mare Winningham as Janice
- David Patrick Kelly as Larry
- Yul Vazquez as Baxter
- Bahni Turpin as Ludlow
- Ryan Cutrona as Piner
- Ato Essandoh
- Kevin Jackson as Mo
- Theothus Carter as Beecher
- Milan Blakely

Many of the prison's inmates and guards were used as actors and extras. Inmates were selected based on behavior; those with disciplinary actions against them were not eligible.

== Release ==
The film premiered at the Tribeca Film Festival on April 20, 2018. On October 12, 2018, HBO acquired distribution rights to the film. The film premiered on HBO on February 23, 2019.

== Reception ==
On Rotten Tomatoes the film has an approval rating of 89% based on reviews from nine critics. On Metacritic the film has a score of 69 out of 100 based on reviews from 8 critics.

Jeffrey Wright was awarded the "Best Actor in a U.S. Narrative Feature Film" at the 2018 Tribeca Film Festival for his role in the film.

Ben Travers at IndieWire gave it a grade B and wrote: "Can be a tad slow, a touch too simple, and even a little distracted from making a larger, more declarative point about modern incarceration. But by carving its own path through Louis...it's nothing short of original." Aryn Braun of The Economist said about the movie, "If Ms Sackler’s goal was to break the stereotypes inherent in the prison-drama genre, she succeeded." The Document Podcast host, Matt Holzman, of KCRW said ""Madeleine wanted to make a movie that basically asks, 'is incarceration the best way to deal with people who commit crimes?" A reviewer for the Chicago Sun Times wrote "Director Madeleine Sackler does a magnificent job of plunging us into this world, in which inmates are almost always seeing things through the bars of their cells, or the tiny windows giving them a glimpse of the sky."

In 2019, the film was listed as one of The Marshall Project's picks for Criminal Justice in Movies, TV, and Podcasts.

In his 2021 book, Empire of Pain: The Secret History of the Sackler Dynasty, Patrick Radden Keefe notes the mysterious source of funding for the project, likely from Madeline Sackler's inheritance from her family, the prime drivers of America's opioid epidemic. The film's star Jeffrey Wright himself expressed concerns. Keefe writes, "Wright had sent Madeleine an email, praising the 'honesty and openness' of the men in her documentary. But there is an 'elephant' in the room, he wrote. 'You've provided a tremendous gift to those men. Something the likes of which they've rarely, if ever been given.' But they know 'nothing of your story,' he pointed out. ' You never spoke to me about any of that. I was aware and only once tried to broach the subject with you. You didn't open up about it. I went on with my work.' Wright wanted to address it now, though. 'Do you think you should take into consideration that this will become part of the dialogue around these films?' he asked." Madeleine did not respond.

== See also ==
- List of hood films
