= Success Academy Charter Schools =

Charter school operator

Location
- 95 Pine Street, New York, N.Y. 10005 (Main office); 40°42′16″N 74°00′23″W

Information
- School type: Public charter with public & private funds
- Established: 2006
- Founder: Joel Greenblatt
- Status: Open
- Authorizer: Charter Schools Institute, State University of New York
- Chief Executive Officer: Eva Moskowitz
- Staff: 2,300
- Grades: K–12
- Gender: Both
- Enrollment: 17,000
- Language: English
- Schedule: Mid-August to mid-June
- Campus type: Urban
- Colors: Orange and blue (logo and uniforms)
- Athletics: Soccer, Track & Field, Cross Country, Basketball
- Tuition: Free
- Communities served: various New York City neighborhoods
- Website: www.successacademies.org

Success Academy Charter Schools, originally Harlem Success Academy, is a charter school operator in New York City founded by investor Joel Greenblatt. Eva Moskowitz, a former city council member for the Upper East Side, is its CEO. It has 47 schools in the New York area and 17,000 students.

== History ==
Hedge fund managers Joel Greenblatt and John Petry founded the school and helped to recruit Eva Moskowitz as CEO. The first Success Academy charter, Harlem Success Academy, opened in 2006 with 157 students chosen by lottery. She subsequently opened more schools in Harlem, and then schools in other New York City neighborhoods. The charter schools are funded by taxpayers and donations. The school was the subject of the 2010 documentary, The Lottery.

In February 2014, New York City Mayor Bill de Blasio decided to stop the city's former policy of providing free space in public school buildings to charter schools, which are publicly funded but privately run, and to evict those schools, including three Success Academy schools already in those buildings. The decision was reversed in April after New York State Governor Andrew Cuomo stepped into the controversy. The city ended up finding space for three Success Academy schools.

John Paulson donated $8.5 million to Success Academy in July 2015 to help open middle schools in Brooklyn and Manhattan. The Success Academy Education Institute was formed in Summer 2016, to distribute the network's curriculum and teacher training resources online to educators across the country.

In 2014, New York City charter schools won the right to provide pre-kindergarten, and Success Academy opened its first pre-kindergarten in fall 2015. In 2015, New York City issued a mandatory contract granting its Department of Education oversight over all pre-kindergarten providers. Success Academy did not sign the contract, citing that the city does not have authority to regulate its charter schools. In June 2016, Success Academy canceled its pre-kindergarten program and filed a suit in the State Supreme Court. The appeals court ruled in favor of Success Academy in June 2017, stating that the city could not regulate a charter school's pre-kindergarten programs, while also awarding $720K in back payments to Success.

== Academics ==
Success Academy gives four weeks of training to teachers in the summer and regular weekly training in the school year. Principals in the charter network spend most of their time coaching teachers. The State University of New York's Board of Trustees has voted to approve regulations that allow Success Academy to certify its own teachers.

As measured by standardized test scores, the students at Success Academy outscore contemporaries in both urban public schools and wealthy suburban schools in the New York City area. In New York City, 47% percent of public school students passed state reading tests, and 43% passed math tests. At Success schools, corresponding percentages were 91% and 98%. These scores come from a student group made up of 95% children of color, with families having a median income of $32,000. No new students above the fourth grade are accepted at Success.

The schools emphasize testing, including giving prizes to students, and publicly ranking how well each student does on the practice tests. As of October 2017, Stanford's Center for Research on Education Outcomes (CREDO) found that Harlem Success Academy students received approximately 137 extra days of learning in reading and approximately 239 additional days of learning in math.

== Schools ==
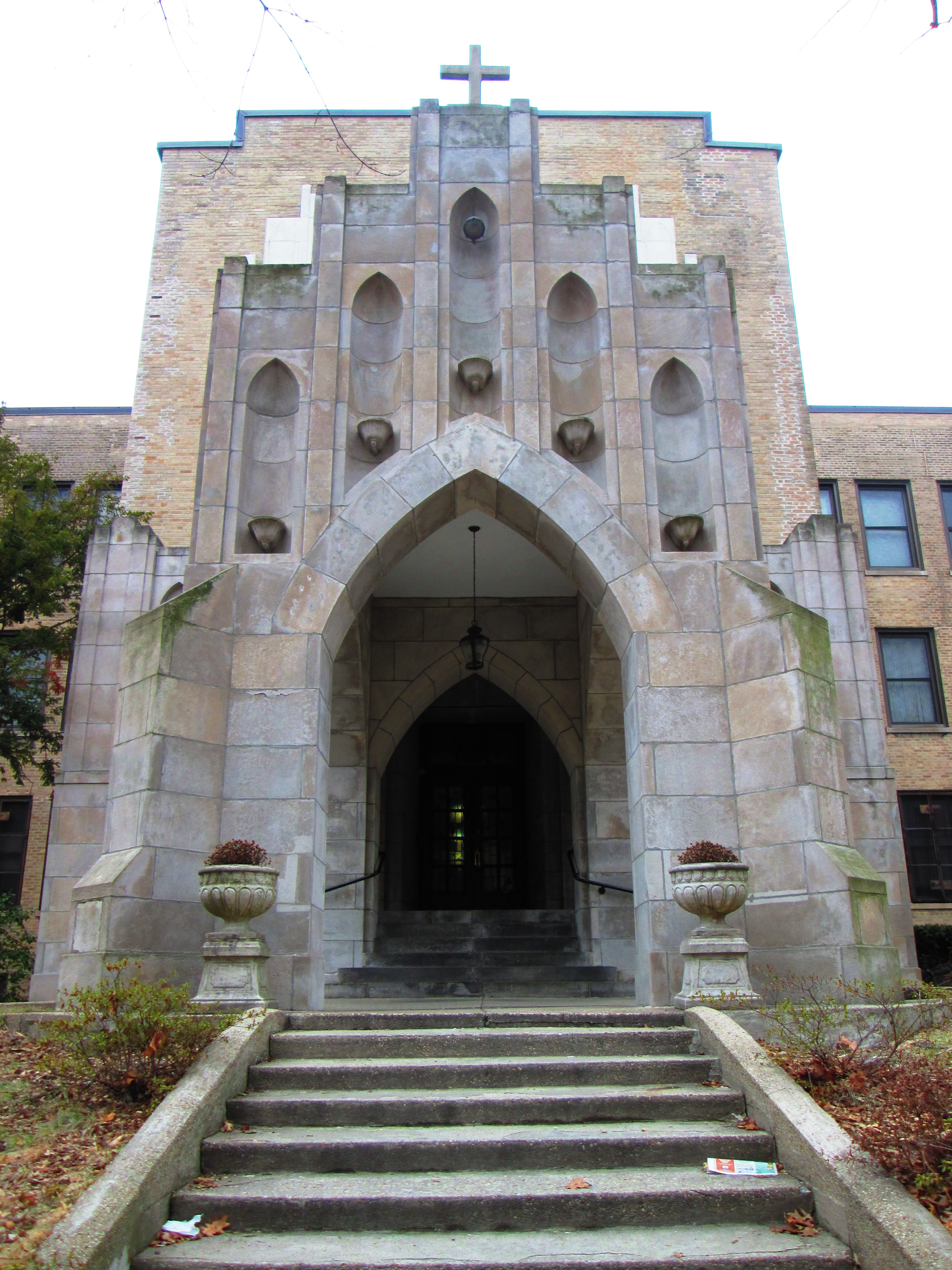
Mother Cabrini High School was one of the facilities that the city arranged for Success Academy to move into (Success Academy Washington Heights)

Success has 45 schools with 17,000 students from kindergarten through high school. According to the New York Post, Success Academy had 17,700 applicants for 3,288 available seats, which resulted in a wait list of more than 14,000 families for the 2018–2019 school year.

The Bronx

- Bronx 1
- Bronx 2
- Bronx 3
- Bronx 4
- Bronx 1 Middle School
- Bronx 2 Middle School

Brooklyn

- Bed-Stuy 1
- Bed-Stuy 2
- Bensonhurst
- Bergen Beach
- Bushwick
- Cobble Hill
- Crown Heights
- Flatbush
- Forte Greene
- Prospect Heights
- Williamsburg
- Bed-Stuy Middle School
- Ditmas Park Middle School
- East Flatbush Middle School
- Lafayette Middle School
- Myrtle Middle School

Manhattan

- Harlem 1
- Harlem 2
- Harlem 3
- Harlem 4
- Harlem 5
- Harlem 6
- Harlem East
- Harlem North Central
- Harlem North West
- Harlem West
- Hell's Kitchen
- Hudson Yards
- Midtown West
- Union Square
- Upper West
- Washington Heights
- Hudson Yards Middle School
- High School of the Liberal Arts – Manhattan

Queens

- Queens Village 1
- Queens Village 2
- Rosedale
- South Jamaica
- Springfield Gardens
- Ozone Park Middle School
- Rockaway Park Middle School

== Controversy ==
In 2014, an assistant teacher made a video recording of a colleague publicly scolding a student who failed to answer a question correctly and tearing up the student's paper. Education experts stated that the teacher's behavior was inappropriate and discouraged learning. A 2015 article in The New York Times reported that discipline, social pressure, positive reinforcement, and suspension are applied to students, as teachers are rewarded for better behavior and performance. Former teachers claimed that they quit because they disagreed with Success' punitive approach to students.

Some parents of special-needs students at Success Academy schools have complained of overly strict disciplinary policies which have resulted in high rates of suspension and attempts to pressure the parents to transfer their special-needs children out of the schools. State records and interviews with two dozen parents indicate that the schools failed at times to adhere to federal and state laws in disciplining special-education students.

In April 2019, a former Success Academy parent filed an official complaint against Success Academy Charter Schools on the grounds that Success Academy systematically removes students with disabilities. The State Department of Education found that Success failed to meet legal requirements for those students.

Statistics gathered by the New York State Education Department show much higher rates of suspension at most Success Academy schools than at public schools. School spokesmen have denied improper treatment of any student, and founder Eva Moskowitz has defended school practices as promoting "order and civility in the classroom".

The selection method for admission has come under fire for an "abdication of responsibility" to educate all children within a geographic area. Moskowitz responds by noting that traditional neighborhood schools can "institutionalize housing segregation, making a child's zip code his educational destiny" while charter schools are tools for "social justice" by allowing parents to choose schools beyond geographic constraints.

In May 2019, the U.S. Department of Education found Success Academy Charter School had released personally identifiable information about a student's discipline records to the press. This disclosure was in response to a PBS NewsHour segment with John Merrow that was itself investigated by the PBS ombudsman, Michael Getler, for having excessively relied on a single identified student, whose family was unwilling to release his school records to PBS investigators to provide journalistic context into the student's depiction. The show went beyond documenting the practice of the school in disciplining students at an unusually young age over minor infractions, into suggesting that the school engaged in this practice to weed undesired students out before state testing begins in the third grade. Success Academy in their rebuttal did not disclose the name of the student, but only one student had publicly identified himself in the NewsHour segment. Given the public allegations of corrupt motivation, Success Academy attorneys that they had no choice but to respond with details of their own, along the lines of objections they had provided PBS before the show aired. Getler concluded that the student's relatively small but important role on the show did not warrant exposure of his extensive record of misbehavior at that school, but chided the episode for not having pursued on-the-record sources for their more severe allegations.

A Success Academy spokesperson resigned due to what she described as "systemic abuse of students, parents, and employees" in June 2020. This resignation occurred in midst of the nationwide Black Lives Matter protests, during which Success Academy faced scrutiny for racist practices within schools and the organizations strict academic and disciplinary policies, that largely impact Black and Brown children.

Robert Pondiscio, author of How The Other Half Learns (2019), which chronicles the structure and achievement of the Success Academy, believes that Moskowitz would quickly expand the system to 100 schools if the charter sector was not "hard up against the charter school cap in the State of New York".

== Awards and recognition ==
In 2012, Harlem Success Academy Charter School 1 became the first city charter school to be awarded a National Blue Ribbon. Harlem Success Academy Charter School 3 was awarded a National Blue Ribbon by the U.S. Department of Education in 2015. In 2016, both Harlem Success Academy Charter School 4 and Bronx Success Academy Charter School 1 were awarded National Blue Ribbons. Success Academy Bed‐Stuy 1 in Brooklyn and Success Academy Harlem 2 in Manhattan received National Blue Ribbons in 2018.

In June 2017, Eli and Edythe Broad Foundation and the National Alliance for Public Charter Schools awarded Success Academy with the 2017 Broad Prize for Public Charter Schools, an award recognizing the best academic outcomes in the nation for low-income students and students of color. In 2015, the Eli and Edythe Broad Foundation and other charter advocates developed the concept of a multi-million dollar, multi-year Great Public Schools Now project to create 260 new charter schools representing 50% of the charter market share in Los Angeles Unified School District (LAUSD) to serve as a model for the expansion of charter schools in the United States.

A grant for $250K to support college-readiness programs was also awarded to Success Academy at the National Charter School Conference in Washington, D.C.

In September 2017, Education Secretary Betsy DeVos announced that Success Academy was one of the recipients of the Department of Education's charter grants. In April 2019 the Department of Education awarded the Academy with a $9,842,050 Charter Schools Program (CSP) grant to "open new schools and expand existing schools"

The schools have been the subject of two documentary films, The Lottery and Waiting for "Superman". By 2019, according to The Washington Post, the Success Academy network of 47 schools serving 17,000 students, is the "highest-performing and most criticized educational institution in New York", and perhaps in the United States. Mayor Michael Bloomberg said that the Harlem Success Academy was "the poster child for this country."
