= Charter schools in the United States =

Independently-managed public schools

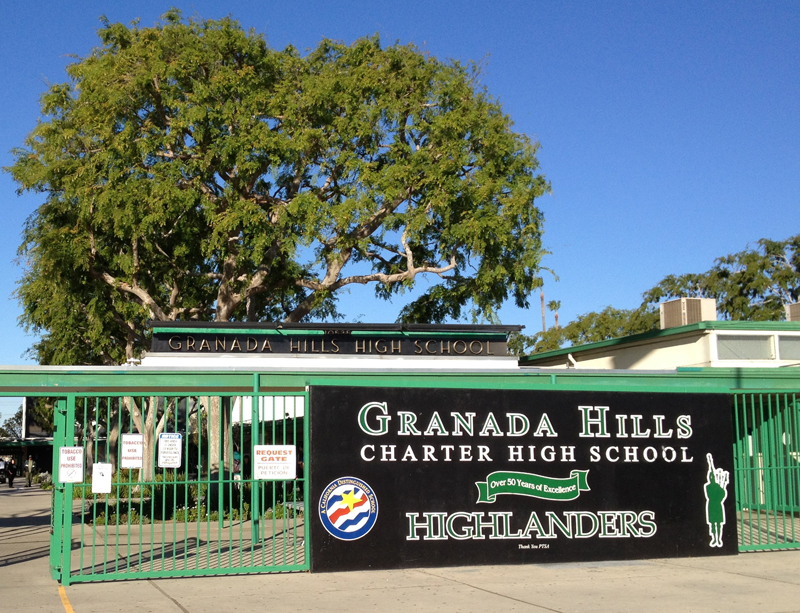
In 2003, Granada Hills Charter High School in Los Angeles became the largest charter school in the United States

Charter schools in the United States are primary or secondary education institutions which receive government funding but operate with a degree of autonomy or independence from local public school districts. Charter schools have a contract with local public school districts or other governmental authorizing bodies that allow them to operate. These contracts, or charters, are how charter schools bear their name. Charter schools are open to all students, depending on capacity, and do not charge tuition. 7.4% of all public school students attended a charter school in the 2021–2022 school year.

The rules governing charter schools, and how they are authorized, differ in each of the states that allow them.

Charter schools may also fundraise independently, in addition to the funding they receive from the government. Charters can be run as either non-profit or for-profit institutions. However, there are some for-profit management organizations that hold charters, though these are only allowed in Arizona. Only non-profit charters can receive donations from private sources, similarly to traditional public schools.

As of 2021, there were an estimated 7,800 public charter schools in 46 states and the District of Columbia, with approximately 3.7 million students In the 2021-2022 school year, 291 new charter schools opened. They educate the majority of children in New Orleans Public Schools. Some charter schools provide a specialized curriculum (for example in arts, mathematics, or vocational training).

Charter schools may be founded by individuals or teacher-parent groups. Two-thirds of charter schools are freestanding and independent; the remainder are managed by a charter management organization or education management organization. Such entries, which manage one or more charter schools, can be either for-profit or non-profit. The first state law in the United States authorizing charter schools was enacted in Minnesota in 1991, and the first charter school that opened as a result of this new law was the City Academy High School in St. Paul.

== History ==
=== 20th century ===
The charter school idea in the United States had several originating sources. In 1971, UC Berkeley professors Stephen Sugarman and Jack Coons published "Family Choice in Education" which outlined the concept of a charter school model. This idea, called "Independent Public Schools" was expanded on in their 1978 volume, "Education by Choice". The term "charter schools" was defined In 1974 by University of Massachusetts Amherst professor Ray Budde. Albert Shanker, president of the American Federation of Teachers, embraced the concept in 1988, when he called for the reform of the public schools by establishing "charter schools" or "schools of choice." Gloria Ladson-Billings called him "the first person to publicly propose charter schools." At the time, a few schools already existed that were not called charter schools but embodied some of their principles, such as H-B Woodlawn.

As originally conceived, the ideal model of a charter school was as a legally and financially autonomous public school (without tuition, religious affiliation, or selective student admissions) that would operate much like a private business—free from many state laws and district regulations, and accountable more for student outcomes rather than for processes or inputs (such as Carnegie Units and teacher certification requirements).

Minnesota was the first state to pass a charter school law in 1991. California was second, in 1992.

=== 21st century ===
As of 2022, 46 states and the District of Columbia have charter school laws, according to the Center for Education Reform.

As of 2012, an authorizer other than a local school board has granted over 60 percent of charters across the country. Between 2009 and 2012, the percent of charter schools implementing performance-based compensation increased from 19 percent to 37 percent, while the proportion that is unionized decreased from 12 percent to 7 percent. The most popular educational focus is college preparation (30 percent), while 8 percent focus on Science, Technology, Engineering, and Mathematics. Another 16 percent emphasize Core Knowledge. Blended Learning (6 percent) and Virtual/Online learning (2 percent) are in use. When compared to traditional public schools, charters serve a more disadvantaged student population, including more low-income and minority students. Sixty-one percent of charter schools serve a student population where over 60 percent qualify for the federal Free or Reduced Lunch Program. Charter schools receive an average 36 percent less revenue per student than traditional public schools, and receive no facilities funds. The number of charters providing a longer school day grew from 23 percent in 2009 to 48 percent in 2012.

In June 2023, Oklahoma approved the first ever Religious Charter school in the United States. In April 2024, the Oklahoma Supreme Court took up the case to explore the constitutionality of such a school.

== General structure and characteristics ==
The rules and structure of charter schools depend on state authorizing legislation and differ from state to state. A charter school is authorized to function once it has received a charter, a statutorily defined performance contract detailing the school's mission, program, goals, students served, methods of assessment, and ways to measure success. The length of time for which charters are granted varies, but most are granted for 3–5 years.

=== Operational autonomy ===
Often, charters create unique school cultures to tailor to students, particularly minority students in urban school districts, whose school performance is affected by social phenomena including stereotype threat, acting white, non-dominant cultural capital, and a "code of the street". Most teachers, by a 68 percent to 21 percent margin, say schools would be better for students if principals and teachers had more control and flexibility about work rules and school duties.

=== Accountability for student achievement ===
Charter schools are accountable for student achievement to their sponsor—a local school board, state education agency, university, or other entity—for producing positive academic results and adhere to the charter contract. While this accountability is one of the key arguments in favor of charters, evidence gathered by the United States Department of Education suggests that charter schools may not, in practice, be held to higher standards of accountability than traditional public schools. Typically, these schools are allowed to remain open, perhaps with new leadership or restructuring, or perhaps with no change at all. Charter school proponents assert that charter schools are not given the opportunities to restructure often and are simply closed down when students perform poorly on these assessments. As of March 2009, 12.5% of the over 5000 charter schools founded in the United States had closed for reasons including academic, financial, and managerial problems, and occasionally consolidation or district interference. A 2013 Study by the Center for Research on Education Outcomes (CREDO) at Stanford University institute linked overall improvement of the charter school sector to charter school closures, suggesting that charter schools as a whole are not getting better, but the closure of bad schools is improving the system as a whole.

Many charter schools are created with the original intent of providing a unique and innovative educational experience to its students. However, charter schools are still held accountable for test scores, state mandates, and other traditional requirements that often have the effect of turning the charter school into a similar model and design as the public schools.

Although the U.S. Department of Education's findings agree with those of the National Education Association (NEA), their study points out the limitations of such studies and the inability to hold constant other important factors, and notes that "study design does not allow us to determine whether or not traditional public schools are more effective than charter schools."

=== Chartering authorities ===
Chartering authorizers, entities that may legally issue charters, differ from state to state, as do the bodies that are legally entitled to apply for and operate under such charters. In some states, like Arkansas, the State Board of Education authorizes charters. In other states, like Maryland, only the local school district may issue charters. Some school districts may authorize charter schools as part of a larger program for systemic improvement, such as the Portfolio strategy. States including Arizona and the District of Columbia have created independent charter-authorizing bodies to which applicants may apply for a charter. The laws that permit the most charter development, as seen in Minnesota and Michigan, allow for a combination of such authorizers. As of 2012, 39% of charters were authorized by local districts, 28% by state boards of education, 12% by state commissions, with the remainder by universities, cities and others.

=== Caps ===
Andrew Rotherham, co-founder of Education Sector and opponent of charter school caps, wrote in 2007, "One might be willing to accept this pent-up demand if charter school caps, or the debate over them, were addressing the greater concern of charter school quality. But this is not the case. Statutory caps as they exist now are too blunt a policy instrument to sufficiently address quality. They fail to differentiate between good schools and lousy schools and between successful charter school authorizers and those with a poor track record of running charter schools. And, all the while, they limit public schooling options and choices for parents."

=== Demographics ===
The U.S. Department of Education's 1997 First Year Report, part of a four-year national study on charters, was based on interviews of 225 charter schools in 10 states. The report found charters tended to be small (fewer than 200 students) and represented primarily new schools, though some schools had converted to charter status. Charter schools often tended to exist in urban locations, rather than rural. This study also found enormous variation among states. Charter schools tended to be somewhat more racially diverse, and to enroll slightly fewer students with special needs or limited English proficiency than the average schools in their state.

=== Funding ===
Charter school funding is dictated by each state. In many states, charter schools are funded by transferring per-pupil state aid from the school district where the charter school student resides. Charters on average receive less money per-pupil than the corresponding public schools in their areas, though the average figure is controversial because some charter schools do not enroll a proportionate number of students that require special education or student support services. Additionally, some charters are not required to provide transportation and nutrition services. The Federal Elementary and Secondary Education Act, Part B, Sections 502–511 authorizes funding grants for charter schools.

In August 2005, the Thomas B. Fordam Institute, a pro-charter group, published a national report of charter school finance. It found that across 16 states and the District of Columbia—which collectively enrolled 84 percent of that year's one million charter school students—charter schools receive about 22 percent less public funding per-pupil than the district schools that surround them, a difference of about $1,800. For a typical charter school of 250 students, that amounts to about $450,000 per year. The study asserts that the funding gap is wider in most of twenty-seven urban school districts studied, where it amounts to $2,200 per student, and that in cities like San Diego and Atlanta, charters receive 40% less than traditional public schools. The funding gap was largest in South Carolina, California, Ohio, Georgia, Wisconsin and Missouri. The report suggests that the primary driver of the district-charter funding gap is charter schools' lack of access to local and capital funding.

A 2010 study by the Center for Education Reform, a pro-charter advocacy group, found that charters received 64 percent of their district counterparts, averaging $7,131 per pupil compared to the average per pupil expenditure of $11,184 in the traditional public schools in 2009/10 compared to $10,771 per pupil at conventional district public schools. Charters raise an average of some $500 per student in additional revenue from donors.

However, funding differences across districts remain considerable in most states that use local property taxes for revenue. Charters that are funded based on a statewide average may have an advantage if they are located in a low-income district, or be at a disadvantage if located in a high-income district.

=== Spending ===
The overwhelming majority of charter schools advertise to attract students unlike traditional schools, where generally, students go to the school closest to their homes. In Utah, some of the schools which spent the most on advertising performed poorly on academic standards. For example, Mountain Heights Academy, which spent $819,000 on marketing from 2015 to 2019, received an "F" from the state in 2016.

In Pennsylvania, 12 of its 14 cyber charter schools spent more than $21 million in taxpayer dollars on advertising over three years.

=== Virtual charter schools ===
In November 2015, the first major study into online charter schools in the United States, the National Study of Online Charter Schools, was published. It found "significantly weaker academic performance" in mathematics and reading in such schools when they were compared to conventional ones. The study was the result of research carried out in 17 US states which had online charter schools, and was conducted by researchers from the University of Washington, Stanford University and Mathematica Policy Research. It concluded that keeping online pupils focused on their work was the biggest problem faced by online charter schools, and that in mathematics the difference in attainment between online pupils and their conventionally educated peers equated to the cyber pupils missing a whole academic year in school.

== State-specific structure and regulations ==
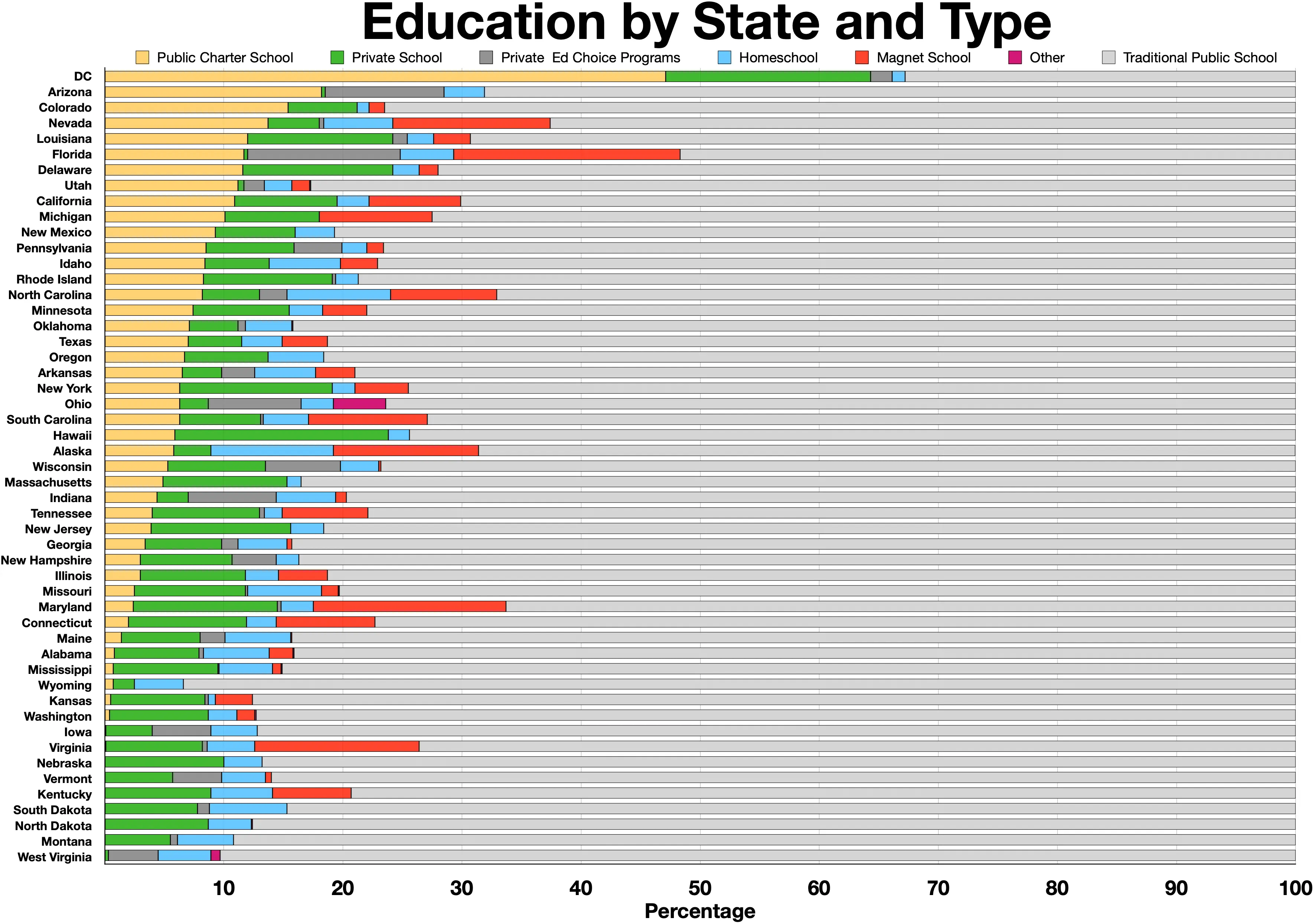
Charter school share in the United States by state Public charter school Private school Private EdChoice Homeschool Magnet school Public school

State laws follow varied sets of key organizing principles based on the Citizens League's recommendations for Minnesota, American Federation of Teachers guidelines, or federal charter-school legislation (U.S. Department of Education). Principles govern sponsorship, number of schools, regulatory waivers, degree of fiscal/legal autonomy, and performance expectations.

=== Center for Education Reform ranking ===
The Center for Education Reform, an organization that advocates in favor of charter schools, has characterized laws as either "strong" or "weak." "Strong-law" states mandate considerable autonomy from local labor-management agreements and bureaucracy, allow a significant number of charter schools to be authorized by multiple charter-granting agencies, and allocate a level of funding consistent with the statewide per pupil average. According to the Center for Education Reform, as of 2022, Arizona and Florida get an "A" grade from a pro-charter school perspective for their laws governing charter schools, while the District of Columbia, Michigan, Indiana, Colorado, Minnesota, Texas and Utah received a "B" rating. This same pro-charter score card ranked Alaska, Virginia, Kansas, and Iowa in last place.

== National evaluations ==
Multiple researchers and organizations have examined educational outcomes for students who attend charter schools. In general, urban charter schools may appear to be a good alternative to traditional urban schools for urban minority students in poor neighborhoods, if one looks strictly at test scores, but students in suburban charter schools do no better than those in traditional suburban schools serving a mostly middle-class white population.

=== United States Department of Education study ===
In its "Evaluation of the Public Charter Schools Program: Final Report" released in 2003, the U.S. Department of Education found that, in the five case study states, charter schools were out-performed by traditional public schools in meeting state performance standards, but noted: "It is impossible to know from this study whether that is because of the performance of the schools, the prior achievement of the students, or some other factor."

=== American Federation of Teachers study ===
A 2004 report by the American Federation of Teachers, a teachers' union, stated that students attending charter schools tied to school boards do not fare any better or worse statistically in reading and math scores than students attending public schools. This report was based on a study conducted as part of the National Assessment of Educational Progress in 2003. The study included a sample of 6000 4th grade pupils and was the first national comparison of test scores among children in charter schools and regular public schools. Rod Paige, the U.S. Secretary of Education from 2001 to 2005, issued a statement saying (among other things) that, "according to the authors of the data the Times cites, differences between charter and regular public schools in achievement test scores vanish when examined by race or ethnicity." Additionally, a number of prominent research experts called into question the usefulness of the findings and the interpretation of the data in an advertisement funded by a pro-charter group. Harvard economist Caroline Hoxby also criticized the report and the sample data, saying "An analysis of charter schools that is statistically meaningful requires larger numbers of students."

=== National Bureau of Economic Research study ===
In 2004, the National Bureau of Economic Research found data that suggested charter schools increased competition in a given jurisdiction, thus improving the quality of traditional public schools (noncharters) in the area. Using end-of-year test scores for grades three through eight from North Carolina's state testing program, researchers found that charter school competition raised the composite test scores in district schools, even though the students leaving district schools for the charters tended to have above average test scores. The introduction of charter schools in the state caused an approximate one percent increase in the score, which constitutes about one quarter of the average yearly growth. The gain was roughly two to five times greater than the gain from decreasing the student-faculty ratio by 1. This research could partially explain how other studies have found a small significant difference in comparing educational outcomes between charter and traditional public schools. It may be that in some cases, charter schools actually improve other public schools by raising educational standards in the area.

=== Caroline Hoxby studies ===
A 2000 paper by Caroline Hoxby found that certain charter school students did better than public school students, although this advantage was found only "among white non-Hispanics, males, and students who have a parent with at least a high school diploma".

Hoxby released a follow-up paper in 2004 with Jonah Rockoff, assistant professor of economics and finance at the Columbia Graduate School of Business, claiming to have again found that charter school students did better than public school students. This second study compared charter school students "to the schools that their students would most likely otherwise attend: the nearest regular public school with a similar racial composition." It reported that the students in charter schools performed better in both math and reading. It also reported that the longer the charter school had been in operation, the more favorably its students compared.

The paper was the subject of controversy in 2005 when Princeton assistant professor Jesse Rothstein was unable to replicate her results. Hoxby's methodology in this study has also been criticized by Lawrence Mishel, who argued that Hoxby's "assessment of school outcomes is based on the share of students who are proficient at reading or math but not the average test score of the students. That's like knowing the poverty rate but not the average income of a community—useful but incomplete." How representative the study is has also been criticized, as the study is only of students in Chicago.

=== Learning gains studies ===
A common approach in education evaluation research is to compare the learning gains of individual students in charter schools to their gains when they were in traditional public schools. Thus, in effect, each student acts as his/her own control to assess the impact of charter schools. A few selected examples of this work find that charter schools on average outperform the traditional public schools that supplied students, at least after the charter school had been in operation for a few years. A possible limitation of this type of study is that it does not automatically distinguish between possible benefits of how the school operates (e.g. school structure) and possible peer effects, that is, effects of students on each other. At the same time, there appears to be a wide variation in the effectiveness of individual charter schools.

=== Meta-analyses ===
A report by the National Alliance for Public Charter Schools, released in July 2005 and updated in October 2006, looked at twenty-six studies that make some attempt to look at change over time in charter school student or school performance. Twelve of these find that overall gains in charter schools were larger than other public schools; four find charter schools' gains higher in certain significant categories of schools, such as elementary schools, high schools, or schools serving at risk students; six find comparable gains in charter and traditional public schools; and, four find that charter schools' overall gains lagged behind. The study also looks at whether individual charter schools improve their performance with age (e.g. after overcoming start-up challenges). Of these, five of seven studies find that as charter schools mature, they improve. The other two find no significant differences between older and younger charter schools.

A 2006 synthesis of findings conducted by Vanderbilt University indicates that solid conclusions cannot be drawn from the existing studies, due to their methodological shortcomings and conflicting results, and proposes standards for future meta-analyses.

=== National Center for Education Statistics study ===
A study released on August 22, 2006, by the National Center for Education Statistics (NCES) found that students in charter schools performed several points worse than students in traditional public schools in both reading and math on the National Assessment of Educational Progress test. Some proponents consider this the best study as they believe by incorporating basic demographic, regional, or school characteristics simultaneously it "... has shown conclusively, through rigorous, replicated, and representative research, whether charter schools boost student achievement ...", while they say that in the AFT study "... estimates of differences between charter schools and traditional public schools are overstated." The Center for Education Reform argued that its demographic controls were highly unreliable, as the percentage of students receiving free lunches does not correlate well to poverty levels, and some charter schools do not offer free lunches at all, skewing their apparent demographics towards higher income levels than actually occur.

=== Center for Research on Education Outcomes ===
Center for Research on Education Outcomes (CREDO) completed two national reports for 2009 and 2013. The reports were the first detailed national assessments of charter schools. The reports analyzed the impact of charter schools in 26 states and found a steady improvement in charter school quality since 2009.

The authors stated, "On average, students attending charter schools have eight additional days of learning in reading and the same days of learning in math per year compared to their peers in traditional public schools." Charter schools also have varying impacts on different demographic groups. Black students in charters get an extra seven days of learning in reading. For low-income charter school students the advantage is 14 days of extra learning in reading and 22 days in math. English Language Learner students in charter schools see a 43-day learning advantage over traditional public school students in reading and an extra 36 days advantage in math.

Charter schools showed a significantly greater variation in quality between states and within states. For example, Arizona charter school students had a 29-day disadvantage in math compared to public school students but charter school students in D.C. had a 105-day advantage over their peers in public schools. While the obvious solution to the widely varying quality of charter schools would be to close those that perform below the level of public schools, this is hard to accomplish in practice as even a poor school has its supporters.

==== Criticism and debate ====
Stanford economist Caroline Hoxby criticized the CREDO study, resulting in a written debate with the authors. She originally argued the study "contains a serious statistical mistake that causes a negative bias in its estimate of how charter schools affect achievement," but after CREDO countered the remarks, saying Hoxby's "memo is riddled with serious errors" Hoxby revised her original criticism. The debate ended with a written "Finale" by CREDO that aimed to rebut both Hoxby's original and revised criticism.

In 2017, the National Education Policy Center also criticized the methods that CREDO used in its studies. They criticized the CREDO studies for "over-interpreting small effect sizes; failing to justify the statistical assumptions underlying the group comparisons made; not taking into account or acknowledging the large body of charter school research beyond CREDO's own work; ignoring the limitations inherent in the research approach they have taken, or at least failing to clearly communicate limitations to readers."

== Local evaluations of charter schools ==
=== Boston, 2009 ===
A study in the Boston Public Schools (BPS) District published in 2009 compared Boston's charter schools to their district school peers as well as Boston's pilot schools, which are public schools that have been granted the flexibility to determine their own budgets, staffing, curricula, and scheduling but remain part of the local school district and subject to collectively bargained pay scales and seniority protections. The report performed analyses using both statistical controls and using pilot and charter applicant lotteries.

The results using statistical controls to control for demographic and baseline state test scores found a positive effect among charter schools similar to a year spent in one of Boston's selective exam schools, with math scores, for instance, showing positive effects of 0.18 and 0.22 standard deviations for charter middle and high schools respectively compared to an effect of 0.20 and 0.16 standard deviations for exam schools. For pilot schools, the report found that in the middle school grades pilot school students modestly underperform relative to similar students attending traditional BPS schools (-0.05 standard deviations in ELA and -0.07 in math) while showing slightly positive results in the high school grades for pilot schools (0.15 standard deviations for writing and 0.06 for math).

The results using a sub-sample of schools with random lottery results found very large positive effects in both math and ELA scores for charter schools, including 0.16 and 0.19 standard deviations in middle and high school ELA scores respectively and 0.36 and 0.17 standard deviations in middle and high school math scores respectively. Boston's pilot schools, however, showed a concerning negative effect in middle school math and ELA and a slightly positive effect in high school.

=== Los Angeles, 2008–2012 ===
CREDO evaluated the impact of charter schools in Los Angeles from 2008 to 2012. The study found that over 48% of Los Angeles charters outperform local public schools in reading and 44% percent of Los Angeles charters outperform local public schools in math. The study concludes they believe not every charter will outperform traditional public schools, but that conditions are well suited for growth.

An evaluation of Los Angeles charter schools from 2002 to 2008, contends that a rapidly diversifying group of schools in the period did not improve charter school student's performance relative to their public school peers.

=== New Orleans, 2010–2015 ===
A 2010 case study by the Harvard Business School examined the charter school reform efforts in New Orleans. Following Hurricane Katrina, the district became composed of 70 Recovery School District (RSD) schools managed by the state (including 37 RSD charter schools) and 16 schools managed by the local Orleans Parish School Board (OPSB) (including 12 OPSB charter schools). Charter schools now account for more than 60% of the public schools in New Orleans. RSD Schools were a result of Act 9 of the Louisiana State Legislature passed in 2003 to manage under-performing schools throughout the state.

When evaluating New Orleans' schools against the 200-point index called the State Performance Index (SPI),19 of the 20 highest-performing non-selective schools were charter schools. Charter schools affiliated with charter management organizations such as KIPP tended to perform better than stand-alone schools. The overall percentage of schools performing below the failing mark of 60 fell from 64% in 2005 to 36% in 2009.

A 2015 study contends that although charter schools may seem to be improving the system overall, these metrics do not take into account race, as many of the underperforming charters primarily educate African-American students. It offers significant concern that current metrics for evaluation are ignoring significant portions of the population and that the media is not taking this into account when considering the impact of charter schools on New Orleans.

=== Massachusetts study, 2014 ===
According to a 2014 study of charter schools in Massachusetts, charter schools performed better in both math and reading than their traditional public school counterparts

=== Texas study, 2020 ===
According to a 2020 study of charter schools in Texas, charter schools had no impact on test scores and adversely affected early-life labor market outcomes.

=== Massachusetts and North Carolina, 2022 ===
A 2022 study found that charter school openings in Massachusetts and North Carolina had no impact on student achievement, but caused a reduction in public school enrollment, in particular white enrollment.

=== Epic Charter Schools, Oklahoma 2022 ===
In 2022, the two co-founders of Epic Charter Schools were charged with felony racketeering and embezzlement.

== Policy and practice ==
As more states start charter schools, there is increasing speculation about upcoming legislation. In an innovation-diffusion study surveying education policy experts in fifty states, Michael Mintrom and Sandra Vergari (1997) found that charter legislation is more likely to be considered in states with poor test scores, Republican legislative control, and proximity to other states with high quality charter schools. Legislative enthusiasm, gubernatorial support, interactions with national authorities, and use of permissive charter-law models increase the chances for adopting what they consider stronger laws. He feels union support and restrictive models lead to adoption of what he considers weaker laws. Other barriers to charter expansion include restrictions on the number of charter schools permissible in a state, lack of state and local funding for facilities and transportation, and a political and philanthropic focus on expanding charter schools in urban areas rather than in suburban or rural areas.

The threat of vouchers, wavering support for public education, and bipartisan support for charter schools has led some unions to start charter schools themselves. Several AFT chapters, such as those in Houston and Dallas, have themselves started charter schools. In New York City, the United Federation of Teachers operates a charter school serving grades 9–12 in Brooklyn, NY. The National Education Association has allocated $1.5 million to help members start charter schools. Proponents claim that charter schools offer teachers a measure of empowerment, employee ownership, and governance that might be enhanced by union assistance (Nathan). Former President George W. Bush's No Child Left Behind Act also promotes charter schools.

Over two dozen private management companies are attempting to increase their 10 percent share of a "more hospitable and entrepreneurial market" (Stecklow 1997). In the late 1990s Boston-based Advantage Schools Inc., a corporation specializing in for-profit schooling, contracted to run charter schools in New Jersey, Arizona, and North Carolina. In July 2001, Advantage Schools, Inc. was acquired by Mosaica Education. The Education Development Corporation was planning in the summer of 1997 to manage nine nonsectarian charter schools in Michigan, using cost-cutting measures employed in Christian schools.

=== Public opinion ===
Historically, Americans have been evenly split on the idea of charter schools, with a roughly even mix of support versus opposition between 2000 and 2005. There is also widespread sentiment that states should hold charter schools accountable, with 80% thinking so in 2005. However, openness to charter schools has been increasing especially among minority communities who have shifted opinions higher than the national average. A 2011 Phi Delta Kappa International-Gallup Poll reported that public support for charter schools stood at a "decade-high" of 70%.

Charter schools provide an alternative for educators, families, and communities who are dissatisfied with educational quality and school district bureaucracies at non-charter schools. In early 2008, the Friedman Foundation for Educational Choice, a pro-charter organization, conducted two polls in primarily conservative states Idaho and Nevada where they asked parents about their preferences concerning education. In Idaho, only 12% of respondents said that their regular public school was their top choice for the children's school. Most preferred private schools over other options. In 2008, polls conducted in the conservative states Georgia and Wyoming found similar results.

The charter approach uses market principles from the private sector, including accountability and consumer choice, to offer new public sector options that remain nonsectarian and non-exclusive. Many people, such as former president Bill Clinton, see charter schools, with their emphasis on autonomy and accountability, as a workable political compromise and an alternative to vouchers. Others, such as former president George W. Bush, see charter schools as a way to improve schools without antagonizing the teachers' union. Bush made charter schools a major part of his No Child Left Behind Act. Despite these endorsements, a recent report by the AFT has shown charter schools not faring as well as public schools on state administered standardized testing, though the report has been heavily criticized by conservatives like William G. Howell of the Brookings Institution. Other charter school opponents have examined the competing claims and suggest that most students in charter schools perform the same or worse than their traditional public school counterparts on standardized tests.

Both charter school proponents and critics admit that individual schools of public choice have the potential to develop into successful or unsuccessful models. In a May 2009 policy report issued by Education Sector, "Food for Thought: Building a High-Quality School Choice Market", author Erin Dillon argues that market forces alone will not provide the necessary supply and demand for excellent public schools, especially in low-income, urban neighborhoods that often witness low student achievement. According to Dillon, "In order to pressure all public schools to improve and to raise student achievement overall, school choice reforms need to not just increase the supply of any schools. They need to increase the supply of good schools, and parents who know how to find them." Drawing lessons from successful food and banking enterprises located in poor, inner-city neighborhoods, the report recommends that policymakers enhance the charter school market by providing more information to consumers, forging community partnerships, allowing for more flexible school financing, and mapping the quality of the education market.

=== Parent considerations ===
The growth in the amount and popularity of charter schools has prompted more parents to consider sending their children to charter schools over public schools. According to Shannon Altenhofen, this changes the question from "'public versus charter school?' to 'which charter school?'".

==== Implications of school choice ====
The concept of school choice views parents as "consumers" with the responsibility of choosing the best possible school for their child. There "is little evidence that parents of different races and social classes value fundamentally different qualities in schools," but there is evidence that "socioeconomic status, social capital, and education level" can limit the parental choice of schools.

Most parents, regardless of class status, rely on their social network for choosing schools. Higher-income parents "have a greater array of social resources and connections to trust when choosing a school, and making the choice seem almost effortless." Upper-income parents might have more access to information which guides their choice of charter schools. One survey study of 553 upper-income mostly White parents in Colorado's charter schools noted the importance of social networking in their decision to choose charter schools. Of those surveyed "95% of parents reported that they relied on talks with other family members, friends, neighbors, coworkers, or parents." This study highlighted that upper-income white parents tend to rely greatly on the information given by those in their social networks, but the parents also did their research on "school quality, curriculum, instruction, and other factors to see whether the school is a good fit for their child.

Low income and minority parents, on the other hand, struggle "when it comes to the amount and type of information they can access." "The many challenges that low-income families face both shape and limit their views of the costs and benefits of various school choice options." A qualitative study conducted in New York City interviewed parents from two similar performing charter schools, one which was "racially and ethnically diverse" and another which was more "racially and ethnically homogeneous," to get an "insight" on parent rationale for choosing that particular charter school. Parents from the homogeneously, Black and Latino, low-income charter school tended to choose their charter school primarily as a desperate escape from the "negative experiences" they had faced at traditional public schools. Many of the parents in this charter school heard about the charter school by simply seeing it in their community or by hearing about it from people in their social network. So in this study, the parents used their social network but did not conduct extensive research so what they knew was more limited. Parents from the more economically and racially diverse school chose the charter school because of the school's unique qualities which they felt would benefit their child. Parents from this school also heard about it in their social networks, but that particular charter school did more outreach through advertisements. In the diverse charter school, White and Asian parents were more likely to transfer out if they were dissatisfied with the charter school as compared to the other ethnic groups.

==== Optimizing selection ====
One experimental research study asked 14,989 parents from Denver to rank their top schools; the researchers then focused on the top first school and surveyed the parents by asking them which "resource," out of all the provided resources, had aided them the most in their decision of ranking their first choice school. The researchers then analyzed the quality of the top school chosen based on the Denver Public Schools School Performance Framework (SPF) with the noted resource. Parents who chose higher-rated schools were more likely to have listed two particular sources of school information. One was the "school choice enrollment guide" and the other resource was "parent websites." The school choice enrollment guide provided parents with a list of "each school's SPF rating." These valuable resources were able to help low-income minority parents choose schools with higher ratings.

=== Debate over funding ===
Nearly all charter schools face implementation obstacles, but newly created schools are most vulnerable. Some charter advocates claim that new charters tend to be plagued by resource limitations, particularly inadequate startup funds. Yet, a few charter schools also attract large amounts of interest and money from private sources such as the Gates Foundation, the Walton Family Foundation, the Broad Foundation, and the NewSchools Venture Fund. Private businesses and foundations, such as Ameritech and the Annenberg Fund, have provided financial support to some charters in assisting with start up costs for new schools.

Although charter advocates recommend the schools control all per-pupil funds, charter advocates claim that their schools rarely receive as much funding as other public schools. Charter schools in California were guaranteed a set amount of district funding that in some districts amounted to $800 per student per year more than traditional public schools received until a new law was passed that took effect in fall 2006. Charter advocates claim that their schools generally lack access to funding for facilities and special program funds distributed on a district basis. Congress and the president allocated $80 million to support charter-school activities in fiscal year 1998, up from $51 million in 1997. Despite the possibility of additional private and non-district funding, a government study showed that charter school may still lag behind traditional public school achievement.

Although charter schools receive less public funding than traditional public schools, a portion of charter schools' operating costs can come from sources outside public funding (such as private funding in the form of donations). A study funded by the American Federation of Teachers found that in DC charter schools, private funding accounted for $780 per pupil on average and, combined with a higher level of public funding in some charters (mostly due to non-district funding), resulted in considerably higher funding when compared to comparable public schools. Without federal funding, private funding, and "other income", D.C. charter schools received slightly more on average ($8,725 versus $8,676 per pupil), but that funding was more concentrated in the better funded charter schools (as seen by the median DC charter school funding of $7,940 per pupil). With federal, private, and "other income", charter school funding shot up to an average of $11,644 versus the district $10,384 per pupil. The median here showed an even more unequal distribution of the funds with a median of $10,333. Other research, using different funding data for DC schools and including funding for school facilities, finds conflicting results.

According to a recent study published in December 2011 by the Center for Education Reform, the national percentage of charter closures were as follows: 42% of charter schools close as a direct result of financial issues, whereas only 19% of charter schools closed due to academic problems. Congress and the president allocated $80 million to support charter-school activities in fiscal year 1998, up from $51 million in 1997. Despite the possibility of additional private and non-district funding, a government study showed that charter school may still lag behind traditional public school achievement.

=== Co-location ===
Co-location or collocation of charter schools in public non-charter school buildings has been practiced in both New York City and Chicago and is controversial. Since students planning to attend charter schools are generally students who would have attended non-charter schools, co-location permits reassigning seating for the same students from one kind of school to the other in the same building, so that, while space might have to be rebuilt, entire schools do not have to be built from the ground up. The cost savings let more charter schools open. Co-location also permits the two kinds of schools to be visible to each other, thereby promoting school reform, especially within families whose children attend both schools in the same building. It may also mean that a government administration responsible for overseeing non-charter public schools loses political turf as it gives up space to independently run charter schools.

== Criticism ==
=== Difficulties with accountability ===
The basic concept of charter schools is that they exercise increased autonomy in return for greater accountability. They are meant to be held accountable for both academic results and fiscal practices to several groups, including the sponsor that grants them, the parents who choose them, and the public that funds them. Charter schools can theoretically be closed for failing to meet the terms set forth in their charter, but in practice, this can be difficult, divisive, and controversial. One example was the 2003 revocation of the charter for Urban Pioneer in the San Francisco Unified School District, which first came under scrutiny when two students died on a school wilderness outing. An auditor's report found that the school was in financial disarray and posted the lowest test scores of any school in the district except those serving entirely non-English-speakers. It was also accused of academic fraud, graduating students with far fewer than the required credits. There is also the case of California Charter Academy, where a publicly funded but privately run chain of 60 charter schools became insolvent in August 2004, despite a budget of $100 million, which left thousands of children without a school to attend.

In March 2009, the Center for Education Reform released its latest data on charter school closures. At that time they found that 657 of the more than 5250 charter schools that have ever opened had closed, for reasons ranging from district consolidation to failure to attract students. The study found that "41 percent of the nation's charter closures resulted from financial deficiencies caused by either low student enrollment or inequitable funding," while 14% had closed due to poor academic performance. The report also found that the absence of achievement data "correlates directly with the weakness of a state's charter school law. For example, states like Iowa, Mississippi, Virginia and Wyoming have laws ranked either "D" or "F". Progress among these schools has not been tracked objectively or clearly." A 2005 paper found that in Connecticut, which it characterized as having been highly selective in approving charter applications, a relatively large proportion of poorly performing charter schools have closed. Under Connecticut's relatively weak charter law, only 21 charter schools have opened in all, and of those, five have closed. Of those, 3 closed for financial reasons. Charter school students in Connecticut are funded on average $4,278 less than regular public school students. However the authors of the 2005 study more centrally find that "lobbies and special interest groups that advocate for charter schools, such as the Center for Education Reform, have been effective in conveying a message that strong charter school laws are those that (i) grant the most autonomy to charter schools and (ii) result in large numbers of charter schools. Contrary to these assumptions, we have seen from our research and state evaluations that permissive laws and states with large numbers of charter schools are often less likely to have positive outcomes".

In a September 2007 public policy report, Andrew Rotherham and Sara Mead of Education Sector offered a series of recommendations to improve charter school quality through increased accountability. Some of their recommendations urged policymakers to: (i) provide more public oversight of charter school authorizers, including the removal of poor-quality authorizers, (ii) improve the quality of student performance data with more longitudinal student-linked data and multiple measures of school performance, and (iii) clarify state laws related to charter school closure, especially the treatment of displaced students. All but 17% of charter school students show no improvement when compared to a heuristically modeled virtual twin traditional public school. Educational gains from switching to charter schools from public schools have on average been shown to be "small or insignificant" (Zimmer, et al.) and tend to decline over a span of time (Byrnes). Charter schools provided no substantial improvement in students' educational outcomes that could not be accounted for in a public school setting (Gleason, Clark and Clark Tuttle). Attrition rates for teachers in charter schools have shown annual rates as high as 40%. Students also tend to move from charter schools prior to graduation more often than do students in public schools (Finch, Lapsley and Baker-Boudissa). Charter schools are often regarded as an outgrowth of the Powell Manifesto advocating corporate domination of the American democratic process and are considered to represent vested interests' attempts to mold public opinion via public school education and to claim a share of this $500–600 billion-dollar industry.

=== Scalability ===
Whether the charter school model can be scaled up to the size of a public non-charter school system has been questioned, when teaching demands more from teachers and many non-charter teachers are apparently unable to teach in the way charters seek, as has been suggested by Arne Duncan, U.S. Secretary of Education, Diane Ravitch, education historian and former assistant U.S. education secretary, Mark Roosevelt, former schools chief for Pittsburgh, Penn., U.S., and Dave Levin, of the KIPP charters However, some, such as Eva Moskowitz of Success Academy Charter Schools, believe that the model can be scaled up.

=== Exploitation by for-profit entities ===
"The education industry," according to these analysts, "represents ... the final frontier of a number of sectors once under public control" that have either voluntarily opened or ... have "been forced" to open up to private enterprise. Indeed ..."the education industry represents the largest market opportunity" since health-care services were privatized during the 1970's ... From the point of view of private profit, one of these analysts enthusiastically observes, "The K–12 market is the Big Enchilada".

— Jonathan Kozol

Critics have accused for-profit entities, (education management organizations, EMOs) and private foundations such as the Bill and Melinda Gates Foundation, the Eli and Edythe Broad Foundation, and the Walton Family Foundation of funding Charter school initiatives to undermine public education and turn education into a "business model" which can make a profit. According to activist Jonathan Kozol, education is seen as one of the biggest market opportunities in America or "the big enchilada".

=== Shift from progressive to conservative movement ===
Charters were originally a progressive movement (called the "small schools" movement) started by University of Massachusetts professor Ray Budde and American Federation of Teachers leader Al Shanker to explore best practices for education without bureaucracy. However, some critics argue that the charter movement has shifted into an effort to privatize education and attack teachers' unions. For example, education historian Diane Ravitch has estimated, as a "safe guess," that 95% of charters in the United States are non-union and has said that charters follow an unsustainable practice of requiring teachers to work unusually long hours.

=== Better student test scores / Teacher issues ===
A 2004 study done by the Department of Education found that charter schools "are less likely than traditional public schools to employ teachers meeting state certification standards," meaning that charter schools might have comparatively low quality teachers. A national evaluation by Stanford University found that "students attending charter schools have eight additional days of learning in reading and the same days of learning in math per year compared to their peers in traditional public schools," potentially leading to better test scores of students.

=== Admissions lottery ===
Because demand often exceeds the supply of available seats in charter schools, lotteries are held to determine which students will be admitted. When admission depends on a random lottery, some hopeful applicants may be disappointed. A film about the admission lottery at the Success Academy Charter Schools (then known as Harlem Success Academy) has been shown as The Lottery. The 2010 documentary Waiting for "Superman" also examines this issue.

=== Collective bargaining ===
Concern has also been raised about the exemption of charter school teachers from states' collective bargaining laws, especially because "charter school teachers are even more likely than traditional public school teachers to be beset by the burn-out caused by working long hours, in poor facilities." As of July 2009, "an increasing number of teachers at charter schools" were attempting to restore collective bargaining rights. Steven Brill, in his book, Class Warfare: Inside the Fight to Fix America's Schools (2011), changed his position on charter schools and unions. He said that after two years of researching school reform, he understood the complexities. He reversed his view of union leader Randi Weingarten and suggested she run the school system for a city.

=== Racial segregation ===
One study states that charter schools increase racial segregation. A UCLA report points out that most charter schools are located in African-American neighborhoods. However, a recent statistical analysis of racial segregation and performance outcomes in U.S. charter schools notes that studies on race and charter schools often incorrectly confound the inter-dependent variables of race and family income (poverty). Moreover, the authors conclude: "charter schools with a strong academic focus and "no-excuses" philosophy that serve poor black students in urban areas stand as contradictions to the general association between school-level poverty and academic achievement. These very high-poverty, high-minority schools produce achievement gains that are substantially greater than the traditional public schools in the same catchment areas." This study concludes that "charter schools are also, on average, more racially segregated than traditional public schools," and state "reducing school segregation and improving the quality of schools serving minority students are both important goals, but they are not the same".

=== Selective admission ===
Regulation of charter schools varies by state, creating a wide variety of admissions processes, some of which are rigorous. Some charter schools interview students or parents, evaluate student records, or require an admissions test. This is similar to other selective admission public schools such as Magnet Schools, career and professional academies, or IB programs. However, this practice has been criticized for contradicting the self-proclaimed mission of these charter schools to provide education for all by only allowing prospective students that demonstrate high academic prospects in.

=== Diverting resources from public schools ===
Many public schools receive funding that is at least partly based on the number of enrolled students. As charter schools attract more students from neighboring public schools, those public schools will start to lose funding. "In just one academic year Albany City, N.Y.'s school district lost $24.9–$26.1 million to charter schools." Despite having less students, public schools still have many fixed costs such as heating and cooling leaving public schools with less funds for other services.

== See also ==
- Education in the United States
- Federal Charter School Program
- Charter School Growth Fund
- Waiting for Superman
- The Lottery

== Bibliography ==
- Brill, Steven (2012). Class Warfare: Inside the Fight to Fix America's Schools. Simon and Schuster. ISBN 978-1-4516-1201-1.
- Ladson-Billings, Gloria (2013). "Lack of Achievement or Loss of Opportunity?". In Carter, Prudence L.; Welner, Kevin G. (eds.). Closing the Opportunity Gap: What America Must Do to Give Every Child an Even Chance. Oxford University Press. pp. 18–19. ISBN 978-0-19-998299-8.
- Rebarber, Ted; Zgainer, Alison Consoletti (February 2014). "Annual Survey of America's Charter Schools 2014" (PDF). Center for Education Reform.
