= Lynn Valley Elementary School =

Public school in Lynn Valley, British Columbia, Canada

Coordinates: 49°20′19″N 123°2′15″W

Lynn Valley Elementary School (usually referred to as "Lynn Valley Elementary") is a public school in Lynn Valley section of the District of North Vancouver, British Columbia, Canada. The school, part of School District 44 North Vancouver, serves children in kindergarten through seventh grade.

A total of 349 students attended Lynn Valley in 2020. The large increase was due to the closing of a nearby Elementary School (Fromme). Most of the students elected to attend Lynn Valley.

Having completed 100 or more student environmental education projects, the school is a "Green School" within the Green Schools Project of the SEEDS Foundation.

== School support services ==
The Lynn Valley Elementary Parents Advisory Council that runs special projects to the school. In the 2007-2008 school year, the PAC planned to fund three artistic performances, the "Learning through the Arts" program and new computers for students. The school has a "Learning Assistance Center" that "provides concentrated assistance in skills development to those students who are considered by their teachers to be capable of a higher level of competence, but who, for various reasons, have not acquired the necessary skills."

The Lynn Valley School Planning Council represents parents, teachers and the school administration in developing annual school plans for improving student achievement. The council is composed of three parents (elected by a community vote), a teacher (nominated by the staff), and the school principal and vice principal. The school's Learning Assistance Centre has a teacher who provides "concentrated assistance in skills development to those students who are considered by their teachers to be capable of a higher level of competence, but who, for various reasons, have not acquired the necessary skills", according to the student handbook. Lynn Valley Elementary has a school counselor and a "School Based Resource Team" for students "experiencing on going difficulties with academics, social, emotional or behavioral issues". The team consists of the student's teacher, the school Learning Assistance Centre teacher, the school counselor, a primary and intermediate staff representative, the principal and vice-principal.

== History ==
The 1920s Lynn Valley Elementary School building, at 3203 Institute Road (now the Community History Centre) has been called "the District of North Vancouver’s finest historic public building" by the North Vancouver Office of Culture and Arts. The "Edwardian Baroque"-style building was designed by local architects Henry Blackadder & Alexander Sinclair Wemyss MacKay.

Educator and author John Goodlad, a student-teacher at the school in the 1940s, wrote that it was "a joy" to work there. Edwin Cohan, the teacher with whom Goodlad was assigned to work, and Stanley Morrison, the principal, "almost raucous in their bantering of one another", Goodlad wrote. They "set a tone of caring and civility that permeated the whole school, affecting adults and children alike. Parents came and went as I had not seen before, knowing that they were welcome and would be listened to."

In 2004, the school celebrated its 100th birthday. A new school building was constructed for $4.6 million (Canadian) and ready by December 2004. In the following two years, the school experienced a large turnover of employees, with new administrators, teachers, office staff and special education aides.

In May 2006, the Community History Centre opened in the former Lynn Elementary School building at 3203 Institute Road (northwest corner of Mountain Highway and Lynn Valley Road). The centre houses the local cultural commission offices, archives reading room, collections, storage, education resource centre and a public meeting room. By March 2006, before most school libraries in the district, Lynn Valley Elementary's school library had replaced its card catalog with computer searching, and checkout functions were also computerized.

A Student Council was established in the fall of 2005.
