= Opportunity hoarding =

Opportunity hoarding occurs when privileged social groups control access to community resources and prevent underprivileged groups from utilizing important resources. The process occurs when a dominant group identifies viable resources and acts in ways that prevents them from being used by individuals outside of this group. Minority groups are often negatively impacted and excluded from the most advantageous economic, social, or educational opportunities. Economic disadvantages and exploitation result when dominant groups benefit from the control of resources produced through the effort of minority groups. In education, middle class families stand to benefit from opportunity hoarding by securing top social and economic advantages for their children. In the school context, opportunity hoarding contributes to the educational achievement gap when parents ensure that their children get all the educational needs that they believe their children need to have so they "do not fail" in both school and the greater economic environment among their peers, the workplace to the disadvantage of students from historically marginalized groups.

Opportunity hoarding can occur through parental involvement from middle-class parents using their political, social, economic, and cultural capital to secure the best educational opportunities for their children. Examples of this are greatly focused on tracking and ensuring that their children are in the high and tracked classes that often time have the best teachers and the least amount of behavior problems. Tracking practices vary greatly by school and in complexity, but the outcome of tracking is often the same as students are placed on vocational or college preparatory paths for their future. Educators, such as teachers, often fight for tracking as it allows them to match the curriculum and their teaching pedagogue to the homogeneity of their class roster. In relationship to opportunity hoarding, tracking greatly benefits high socioeconomic students. Within highly tracked schools, upper middle class and wealthy parents are often actively and aggressively securing top opportunities for their students.

Opportunity hoarding demonstrates the financial, organizational, and institutional advantages the students in suburbs acquired and utilized to take advantage of immeasurable opportunities when students in urban environments and schools faced some of the most concentrated poverty and lack of opportunities even with the federal measures, such as Title I, to increase the educational status within the urban education environments. Some lower and working class parents counter the impact of opportunity hoarding through opportunity prying, an attempt to “pry” any opportunity out of the middle-class families to provide their children educational opportunity. This often looks like the enrollment of lower socioeconomic status students in voucher schools, parent trigger laws, however lower socioeconomic status families often remain in underperforming schools.

Alongside exploitation, opportunity hoarding has been identified as one of the components of collective violence that sustain a spectrum of inequalities between members of a society.
