= Jeannie Oakes =

- Born: Jeannette Louise Oakes
- Known for: Critical work on ability tracking in schools and social justice research for action
- Spouse: Martin Lipton

Academic background
- Education: Ph.D., Education, University of California, Los Angeles (1980); M.A., American Studies, California State University, Los Angeles (1969); B.A., English, San Diego State University (1964)

Jeannette Louise Oakes (born January 15, 1943; dead April 25, 2024) was an American educational theorist and Presidential Professor Emerita in Educational Equity at UCLA's Graduate School of Education & Information Studies. She was the founder and former director of UCLA’s Institute for Democracy, Education and Access (IDEA), the former director of the University of California’s All Campus Consortium on Research for Diversity (ACCORD), as well as the founding director of Center X, which is UCLA’s reform-focused program for the preparation of teachers and school administrators.

Oakes’s research focused on schooling inequalities and on supporting and documenting activism for social justice. She began her career at RAND Corporation, where she authored Keeping Track, which is the seminal book on ability tracking.

== Education ==
- Ph.D., Education, University of California, Los Angeles (1980). Advisor: John Goodlad
- M.A., American Studies, California State University, Los Angeles (1969)
- B.A., English, San Diego State University (1964)

== Professional life ==
=== Early career ===
After graduating in 1980, Oakes stayed at UCLA as a Senior Research Associate until 1985, when she took a position at RAND Corporation, where she worked as a Senior Social Scientist in RAND’s Education and Human Resources Program from 1985 to 1989.

Using data she gathered while working with John Goodlad on the study that resulted in Goodlad’s book A Place Called School (1984), Oakes authored the seminal book on ability tracking, Keeping Track: How Schools Structure Inequality, published in 1985 by Yale University Press. While at RAND, Oakes built a reputation as an expert in educational indicator development.

=== Academic career ===
Oakes moved from RAND to a tenured position at UCLA, bypassing the standard seven-year tenure process by virtue of her strong publication record and national stature. Beginning in 1989, and continuing until 2008, she worked at UCLA, eventually becoming Presidential Professor in Educational Equity in the Graduate School of Education & Information Studies.

In the 1990s, Oakes and her colleagues studied school-reform processes, focused in particular on detracking reforms. These efforts resulted in, among other work, a book recognized by the American Educational Research Association as its outstanding book of the year: Becoming good American schools: The struggle for civic virtue in education reform. She also worked as an expert witness in several desegregation cases, focused on second-generation segregation through racial tracking – in Rockford (IL), San Jose (CA), Wilmington (DE), and Oxford (MS). In her time at the university, she taught courses in urban school policy and history in the Urban Schooling division of UCLA’s Graduate School of Education & Information Studies. She also founded and directed UCLA’s Institute for Democracy, Education and Access (IDEA) and Center X, each of which is discussed briefly below.

UCLA's Institute for Democracy, Education, and Access (IDEA) researches racial and social class inequalities in education. It supports educators, community activists, youth and others as they use and conduct research with the goal of improving public schools and increasing successful college participation. Oakes analyzed IDEA’s efforts to link research, participatory inquiry, and community organizing in the book, Learning power: Organizing for education and justice (co-authored with John Rogers, 2006).

Center X was created to house UCLA’s Teacher Education, Principal Leadership Institute, and professional development initiatives. The “X” signals the intersection of research and practice for preparing and supporting K–12 teachers and administrators, and Center X foregrounds social justice and care, along with instructional excellence, with a focus on urban schools. Oakes's leadership in urban teacher preparation led her to write the influential textbook Teaching to change the world.

Oakes also founded and directed an interdisciplinary, multi-campus research center devoted to a more equitable distribution of educational resources and opportunities in California’s diverse public schools and universities. The University of California’s All Campus Consortium on Research for Diversity (ACCORD), which the UC stopped funding around 2015, used fellowship programs to create a supportive pipeline for young scholars whose work focused on racial equity in education.

From 2000 through 2004, she served as an expert in the Williams v. California litigation, bringing together a team of experts who collectively presented research evidence describing inequities facing students throughout the state of California. This research was collected into a special issue of Teachers College Record. The case was settled in 2004, with the state agreeing to spend almost a billion dollars to address the inequities.

=== Later career ===
In November 2008, Oakes left UCLA to join the Ford Foundation as its director of education and scholarship. She led the Foundation's “More and Better Learning Time” initiative, which was an equity-focused version of Expanded learning time. The core idea is that children and youth with less access to enriching learning opportunities need those opportunities built into their time in school and their time after school, just as do more advantaged students.

After leaving Ford, she was elected 100th President of the American Education Research Association and focused her Presidential year on advancing public scholarship.

Currently, she is a senior fellow in residence at the Learning Policy Institute and a Fellow of the National Education Policy Center . In these capacities, Oakes co-authored a review of the community schools evidence base, jointly released by LPI and NEPC. This work consisted of a series of products, including a policy brief, research brief, and research report. The policy brief was awarded “Outstanding Short Policy Report” by Division L (Educational Policy and Politics) of the American Educational Research Association at the 2018 Annual meeting. She has given a number of talks on the topic of community schools, including a keynote address at a 2017 community schools symposium organized by Teachers College, Columbia University. In her role at the Learning Policy Institute, Oakes has also focused on issues of equitable school finance and resources, including work in North Carolina and her current home state of New Mexico.

== Selected publications ==
=== Books ===
Among the books that Oakes has written are:

- Preparing Teachers for Deeper Learning (co-authored with Linda Darling-Hammond, 2019).
- Learning Time: In Pursuit of Educational Equity (co-authored with Marisa Saunders and Jorge Ruiz de Velasco, 2017).
- Beyond tracking: Multiple Pathways to College, Career, and Civic Participation (co-edited with Marisa Saunders, 2008).
- Learning Power: Organizing for Education and Justice (co-authored with John Rogers, 2006).
- Teaching to Change the World (co-authored with Martin Lipton, Lauren Anderson, and Jamy Stillman, 5th edition published in 2018).

Keeping Track: How Schools Structure Inequality (1st edition in 1985, 2nd edition in 2005).

- Becoming Good American Schools: The Struggle for Civic Virtue in Education Reform (co-authored with Karen Hunter Quartz, Steve Ryan, and Martin Lipton, 2000).
- Making the Best of Schools: A Handbook for Parents, Teachers, and Policymakers (co-authored with Martin Lipton, 1990).

=== Journal articles and reports ===
- 2016 AERA Presidential Address: Public Scholarship: Education Research for a Diverse Democracy (2017).
- Community Schools: An Evidence-Based Strategy for Equitable School Improvement (2017).
- Social Movement Organizing and Equity-Focused Educational Change: Shifting the Zone of Mediation (2010).
- Grassroots Organizing, Social Movements, and the Right to High-Quality Education (2008).Structuring Curriculum: Technical, Normative, and Political Considerations (2007).
- Removing the Roadblocks: Fair College Opportunities for All California Students (2006).
- Schools That Shock the Conscience: Williams v. California and the Struggle for Education on Equal Terms Fifty Years after Brown (2004).
- Separate and Unequal 50 Years After Brown: California’s Racial “Opportunity Gap” (2004).
- Research for high-quality urban teaching: Defining it, developing it, assessing it (2002).
- Becoming Good American Schools: The Struggle for Civic Virtue in Education Reform (2000).
- Matchmaking: The Dynamics of High School Tracking Decisions (1995).
- Two Cities' Tracking and Within-School Segregation (1995).
- Can tracking research inform practice? Technical, normative, and political considerations (1992).
- What educational indicators? The case for assessing the school context (1989).
- Multiplying inequalities: The effects of race, social class, and tracking on opportunities to learn mathematics and science (1990).

== Awards and recognition ==
Oakes was elected in 2004 to the National Academy of Education. She has also received four major awards from the American Educational Research Association: (1) the Early Career Award (1990); (2) the award for the most Outstanding Research Article of 1997; (3) the 2001 Outstanding Book Award for Becoming Good American Schools: The Struggle for Civic Virtue in Education Reform; and (4) the best policy report of 2018, from the organization’s Educational Policy and Politics division.

Her other awards include the Southern Christian Leadership Conference—Ralph David Abernathy Award for Community Service (1997); the Multicultural Research Award from the National Association for Multicultural Education (1998); the American Association of Colleges of Teacher Education—Margaret Lindsey Award for Research (2000); the Jose Vasconcellos World Award in Education (2002) ; and the Outstanding Public Educator Award from the Horace Mann League (2019). She was appointed by President Obama in 2016 to the National Board For Education Sciences.
