= Kevin G. Welner =

- Born: December 26, 1963; Los Angeles, California, U.S.
- Awards: Early Career Award, AERA; Palmer O. Johnson Memorial Award, AERA; Outstanding Public Communication of Education Research Award, AERA

Academic background
- Education: University of California, Santa Barbara, BA 1985; University of California, Los Angeles, JD 1988; University of California, Los Angeles, PhD 1997
- Doctoral advisor: Jeannie Oakes

Academic work
- Discipline: Education policy analysis
- Institutions: National Education Policy Center; University of Colorado Boulder

Kevin G. Welner (born December 26, 1963) is professor of education at the University of Colorado Boulder School of Education, where he chairs the Educational Foundations Policy and Practice program area. He co-founded and served as the director of the National Education Policy Center. He has authored or edited 11 books and more than 100 articles and book chapters concerning education policy and law.

== Education and career ==
Welner received a B.A. from University of California-Santa Barbara, a J.D. at UCLA School of Law, and a Ph.D. from UCLA Graduate School of Education & Information Studies. During his early career he received a National Academy of Education/Spencer postdoctoral fellowship.

Welner joined the faculty of the University of Colorado Boulder School of Education in 1999 as an assistant professor. He became a professor in 2009, where he serves as a professor of educational foundation policy and practice.

In 2014, Welner co-founded the Schools of Opportunity awards project, which seeks to "highlight public high schools that actively seek to close opportunity gaps."

== Recognition (awards/honors) ==
In 2012, Welner was inducted as an American Educational Research Association Fellow. Welner is notable for making technical research documents accessible to the general public, and for participating in public academic debates on education reform issues such as standardized testing and school choice. Other awards and recognitions include:

- Outstanding Public Communication of Education Research Award, American Educational Research Association, 2017
- Early Career Award, American Educational Research Association, 2006
- Palmer O. Johnson Memorial Award, American Educational Research Association, 2005
- Spencer Fellowship conferred by National Academy of Education, 2000

== Views and research ==
Welner has studied the public right to education, tracking, school vouchers, school choice, educational equity, and the use of research.

=== Vouchers and School Choice ===
In 2005, Welner conducted research on school vouchers as a resident of the Rockefeller Foundation Bellagio Center. That research was later published as a major work on school vouchers, NeoVouchers: The Emergence of Tuition Tax Credits for Private Schooling. The book provided an early explanation of the legal and policy issues surrounding a then-new type of private school vouchers. These neo-vouchers were created by giving large tax credits for donations to organizations that then packaged those donations as vouchers to fund tuition. Welner's work on school choice is employed and reviewed in several publications.

=== Educational Equity ===
Welner has contributed to the study of educational equity through his research and policy initiatives. In Closing the Opportunity Gap: What America Must Do to Give Every Child an Even Chance, Welner examines factors that lead to educational disparities and suggests strategies to address them. His book Legal Rights, Local Wrongs: When Community Control Collides with Educational Equity explores the challenges of achieving equitable education within various local governance frameworks. Both books have been reviewed in the academic press and elsewhere. Additionally, Welner co-founded the Schools of Opportunity awards, which recognize schools that implement effective practices to close opportunity gaps.

== Bibliography ==
- Welner, Kevin G. (July 30, 2000). "Taxing the Establishment Clause: Revolutionary Decision of the Arizona Supreme Court". Education Policy Analysis Archives. 8 (36): 36. doi:10.14507/epaa.v8n36.2000.
- — (June 24, 2001). "Alexander v. Sandoval:A Setback for Civil Rights". Education Policy Analysis Archives. 9 (24): 24. doi:10.14507/epaa.v9n24.2001.
- Welner, Kevin G.; Kupermintz, Haggai (January 1, 2004). "Rethinking Expert Testimony in Educational Rights Legislation". Educational Evaluation and Policy Analysis. 28 (1): 127–142. doi:10.3102/01623737026002127. S2CID 15438729.
- Welner, Kevin G. (July 2, 2004). "Colorado's Voucher Law: Examining the Claim of Fiscal Neutrality". Education Policy Analysis Archives. 12 (31): 31. doi:10.14507/epaa.v12n31.2004.
