= David Krathwohl =

American psychologist

David Reading Krathwohl (May 14, 1921 – October 13, 2016) was an American educational psychologist. He was the director of the Bureau of Educational Research at Michigan State University and was also a past president of the American Educational Research Association, where he served in multiple capacities, as a member of the research advisory committee for the Bureau of Research of the USOE and as regional chairman of the board of trustees of the Eastern Regional Institute for Education.

== Biography ==
Krathwohl was born in Chicago on May 14, 1921. He was the son of William Charles and Marie Krathwohl. After earning a bachelor's degree at the University of Chicago, he served in the U.S. Army during World War II. He later returned to the University of Chicago, where he received both his M.S. and his Ph.D. While studying with Benjamin Bloom, he co-authored the Taxonomy of Educational Objectives (also known as Bloom's Taxonomy).

He was the Hannah Hammond Professor of Education and dean of the School of Education at Syracuse University. Krathwohl independently developed the affective domain taxonomy, which was ordered according to the principle of internalization. Internalization is the “process whereby a person’s affect toward an object passes from a general awareness level to a point where the affect is internalized and consistently guides or controls the person’s behavior.” This taxonomy is presented in five stages: receiving, responding, valuing, organization, and characterization.

Krathwohl died on October 13, 2016.

== Early life ==
Krathwohl also served as the director of the Bureau of Educational Research at Michigan State University. He was a member of the research advisory committee for the Bureau of Research of the USOE, and served as a regional chairman of the board of trustees of the Eastern Regional Institute for Education, while being the president of the American Educational Research Association (AERA) from. In addition to being the AERA president, Krathwohl served as president of the Educational Psychology Division of the American Psychological Association. He was also an AERA Fellow and a fellow at the Center for Advanced Study in the Behavioral Sciences at Stanford University. While still being an active member of AERA, he served on the Division of Measurement and Research Methodology, as well as the Professors of Educational Research and Mixed Methods Research SIGs.

== Bloom's Taxonomy ==
David Krathwohl made many contributions to Bloom's Taxonomy. This set a framework for classifying students to learn as a result of instruction. Krathwohl described this as a “means of facilitating the exchange of test items among faculty at various universities to create banks of items, each measuring the same educational objective." Krathwohl and Bloom worked closely together while they were at the University of Chicago, where Krathwohl completed both his master's and his doctorate degrees. This is where Bloom came up with the idea of the educational taxonomy, and Krathwohl assisted on many accounts. Although Bloom's original taxonomy consisted of six categories, when Krathwohl revised it, it consisted of four, more precise categories. These categories were known as knowledge dimension parts, and these included: factual knowledge, conceptual knowledge, procedural knowledge, and metacognitive knowledge. Each of those categories was broken down into smaller, more complex parts than the original taxonomy. Then, he broke the cognitive processes part into six different categories: remember, understand, analyze, apply, evaluate, and create.

== Revision of Bloom's Taxonomy ==
While revising the taxonomy in 2001, Krathwohl helped to reorganize and highlight the interactions between two dimensions: cognitive processes and knowledge content. While reorganizing the taxonomy, they emphasized a refocus on educational outcomes back to the original handbook, which was ahead of its time and can still offer assistance to modern educators who will want to refer to it. It also helped to give new findings in psychology and education into a different framework. The other ideal thing that they focus on is that the cognitive processes are represented as verbs, while the knowledge content is presented as nouns. He also renamed the exchanging levels of Evaluation and Synthesis to creation.

Educational offices
Preceded by John Goodlad	President of the American Educational Research Association; 1968–1969	Succeeded by Roald Campbell
