= Federal Charter School Program =

American government program to fund management of charter schools

The Federal Charter School Program was created in 1994 as an amendment to the Elementary and Secondary Education Act. The program provides federal funding to state or local education agencies that manage the development and execution of charter schools within the USA. As of 2023, the program's annual budget was $440 million.

== Historical context ==
A charter is the "grant of authority or rights, stating that the granter formally recognizes the prerogative of the recipient to exercise the rights specified." Or, a charter is the approval of one party to another party's application to exercise rights. A charter school is a school that applies to a relevant authority to exercise certain actions and is granted that right by the authority, which in the case of charter schools is usually a local or state education agency.

Charter school supporters argue that the increased autonomy of charter schools allows for more effective management, and a louder voice for stakeholders that can shape how charter schools are run.

The term "charter schools" was first brought into the public eye when "delegates to the 1988 national convention of the American Federation of Teachers [had] 'proposed that local school boards and unions jointly develop a procedure that would enable teams of teachers and others to submit and implement proposals to set up their own autonomous public schools within their school buildings...'" Ray Budde had introduced the idea earlier that year in his publication "Education by Charter: Restructuring School Districts," in which he suggested that faculty or administrators could develop charters for specific programs within schools; the idea of developing actual charter schools stemmed from his original proposal. However, Albert Shanker transformed the idea into creating entire charter-based schools while he was president of the American Federation of Teachers, from 1974 to 1997.

In 1991, Minnesota enacted the first state law authorizing charter schools. A year later, the nation's first charter school (City Academy High School) opened. California became the second state to pass a law authorizing charters, in 1992.

As of 2021-2022 there were an estimated 7,800 public charter schools in 46 states and the District of Columbia, with approximately 3.7 million students 7.4 percent of all public school students attended a charter school in the 2021-2022 school year.

Generally, states that are poorer and have more powerful teachers' unions lobbying groups are less likely to pass charter school legislation. Higher income populations are more likely to organize and successfully lobby for charter school legislation.

=== Charter schools today ===
Today's charter schools are centered within urban areas, and generally accept a higher proportion of low-achieving, low-income students. In general, they are small – with about 60% enrolling fewer than 200 students (in comparison, only about 16% of traditional public school enroll fewer than 200 students), and have a slightly lower proportion of students with disabilities and who are limited in English proficiency.

While most charter schools are run by independent organizations, an increasing number are run by "name-brand" charter organizations such as KIPP (The Knowledge is Power Program), EdisonLearning, EdVisions or Big Picture. The creation of these management organizations develops from the philosophy that there needs to be a way to quickly replicate the success of charter schools if they are truly going to transform education. These organizations seek to franchise charter schools – or build individually managed units that follow the basic philosophy and regulations of a central organization – in order to grow their charter school model.

== The Federal Charter School Program ==
The politically charged momentum of charter schools is partially due to the fact that it has gained supporters from both sides of the political spectrum; liberals support the idea of "accountable reform" within the public school system, while conservatives support a system that competes with traditional public schools. State and local support of charter schools is inextricably embroiled within parochial politics, and affected by the needs, desires, and incentives posed by local education systems. Accordingly, attitudes towards charter schools vary by state, and it is difficult to make a general statement about charter schools in the national political imagination. Ray Budde, in his 1996 article "The Evolution of the Charter Concept" explained that while the stakeholders in a traditional public school district may not be inclined to introduce reforms for altruistic or idealistic reasons, they might "restructure the establishment if they felt that they were under severe pressure and that not changing would have more serious consequences than changing." Budde's 15-year-old prediction has proved true, as many urban school systems have been pushed to adopt drastic reform measures solely to stop students from fleeing to charter schools.

While many states were quick to jump on the charter school legislation bandwagon, there was no federal legislation addressing the movement until 1994. In 1994, under the Clinton administration, the basic Charter Schools Program (CSP) was created as an amendment to the Elementary and Secondary Education Act of 1965. The purpose of the program was to provide funds to State Education Agencies (SEA) in order to create and support charter schools. Four years later, the program was amended in the "Charter Schools Expansion Act" of 1998. The act was widely supported in both houses, with an 84% vote in the House of Representatives, and a 100% vote in the Senate.

The purpose of the program is to provide funds to "plan, design and implement new charter schools, as well a to disseminate information on successful charter schools" in order to "expand the number of high-quality charter schools available to students across the Nation." Through the creation of the CSP the Federal government recognized the power of charter schools to transform the public education system by both challenging traditional public schools to improve their quality of education, as well as by "enhance[ing] parent and student choices among public schools and give[ing] more students the opportunity to learn to challenging standards." The advent of charter schools reflects the rise of parental choice and accountability regarding education policy.

=== CSP Funding ===
In 1995, its first year of providing funds, the CSP provided $4,539,548 of appropriations to nine applicants. Since then, the program has drastically increased the funds it provides, but has not drastically increased the number of recipients – meaning more funding is going to the same number of applicants. For example, In 2010, the highest spending year of CSP, the program awarded $138,004,339 of appropriations to twelve recipients. The awards per recipient for 2010 ranged from about $1.3 million to about $51.9 million. The CSP in general approves applications for funds from SEAs that oversee charter schools. However, in the case that a state does not apply for funding, or is denied funding, individual charter schools may apply directly to the CSP. Once SEA's have received funds, they may not sub-grant the award to a charter school unless it meets the following criteria:

1. It is exempt from significant State or local rules that 'inhibit the flexible operation and management' of public schools
2. It is created by a developer as a public school, and is operated under public supervision and direction.
3. It operates in "pursuit of a specific set of educational objectives."
4. It provides either elementary or secondary education, or both.
5. It is not affiliated with a sectarian school or religious institution. (However, like other public schools, charter schools may enter into partnerships with religious groups for secular purposes, like tutoring or recreational activities.)
6. It does not charge tuition.
7. It complies with the Age Discrimination Act of 1975.
8. Parents choose to send their children to the school, and that if more students apply than can be accommodated they are chosen through a lottery.
9. It agrees to comply with the same federal and state audit requirements of traditional public schools.
10. It meets all applicable federal, state and local health and safety requirements.
11. It operates in accordance with state law.
12. It has a written performance contract with an authorized public chartering agency in the state, which includes a description of how student performance will be measured, and can be compared to assessments required of traditional public schools.

These funds may be used for up to three years. In addition, the SEA may reserve up to 5 percent of funds for administrative expenses, and up to 10 percent to support dissemination activities (or activities that help open new public schools, including charter schools.)

In 2010, the Obama administration renewed the Elementary and Secondary Education Act (which includes the Charter School Program), but with strengthened accountability measures. In a press release entitled "Public School Choice" the administration explained that the program would provide competitive grants to state education agencies or local education agencies that managed charter schools, but that applications would be evaluated based on "record of past success in funding, supporting authorizing, managing, or operating (as relevant) high-performing public charter schools or other high-performing autonomous public schools; their record of cutting off funding to or closing low-performing charter schools...; and their commitment to improving the quality of their schools in the future."

== Debate ==
The growth of the charter school movement has been paralleled by the growth of an accountability movement within the public education system. If charter schools have the potential of being the future "public schools," then we must confirm that they are running more effectively than the traditional school. As a result, many accountability studies have been conducted on the effectiveness of charter schools. Many accounts state that overall charter schools are doing a good job in meeting their goals. A study by the Center for Education Reform showed that between the mid 1990s and the fall of 2000, most charters were "doing the job they were designed to do, with 88 major reports now showing that charter schools are improving education for American kids."

Stakeholders seem to uphold this consensus, as shown in a study conducted by the Columbia Teachers College of parental evaluations of traditional public schools and charters in Washington D.C. In the survey, "parents with children in charter schools rated their teachers, principals, facilities, and schools higher than their traditional public school counterparts." While this satisfaction could be influenced by the fact that parents chose to send their students to the school (and are therefore more likely to approve of the school), it is also noted in the study that "many charter schools have a culture that provides parents opportunities to influence school management, and to become more involved with the processes of school governance and functioning."

However, there are many who claim that overall, there is no evidence that charter schools perform better than traditional schools – and that charter schools have other adverse effects on public school students. Tal Levy, in his essay entitled "Charter School Legislation and the Entitlement of Race" argues that the high number of minority students that enroll in charter schools actually deepens segregation within the public school system. He states "70% of African American students in charter schools attend intensely segregated minority schools compared to 34% of African American public school students."
