= William G. Howell =

American political scientist and author (born 1971)

William Howell
- Born: September 18, 1971 (age 54); Kaiserslautern, West Germany (now Germany)
- Education: Wesleyan University (BA); Stanford University (MA, PhD)
- Website: Official website

William G. Howell (born September 18, 1971) is an American political scientist and author. He is the dean of the Johns Hopkins University School of Government and Policy. He was previously the Sydney Stein Professor in American Politics at Chicago Harris and a professor in the Department of Political Science and the College at the University of Chicago. He has written widely on separation-of-powers issues and American political institutions, especially the presidency.

== Education and work experience ==
Howell attended Wesleyan University as an undergraduate, earning his B.A., with high honors, in 1993. Howell completed his Ph.D. in Political Science from Stanford University in 2000. He was the recipient of E.E. Schattschneider Award for the best dissertation in American politics (2001), by the American Political Science Association and recipient of the best dissertation on the presidency (2001), by the Center for Presidential Studies at the George Bush School of Government and Public Service, Texas A&M University. Howell taught in the Political Science Department at the University of Wisconsin-Madison from 2000-2002, before moving to Harvard University in 2002. He taught in the Government Department at Harvard until 2006 when he came to the University of Chicago. He moved to Johns Hopkins in 2025 as the inaugural deans of the School of Government and Policy. Additionally, he has been a fellow at the Center for Advanced Studies in the Behavioral Sciences at Stanford University.

== Current research ==
Howell is currently working on research projects on Obama's education initiatives, distributive politics, and the normative foundations of executive power. Howell recently published two books, one with coauthors Saul Jackman and Jon Rogowski entitled The Wartime President: Executive Influence and the Nationalizing Politics of Threat (University of Chicago Press, 2013); and the other, with David Brent, entitled Thinking about the Presidency: The Primacy of Power (Princeton University Press, 2013). He also is the co-author (with Jon Pevehouse) of While Dangers Gather: Congressional Checks on Presidential War Powers (Princeton University Press, 2007); author of Power without Persuasion: The Politics of Direct Presidential Action, one of Choice's Top Academic Titles for 2004, (Princeton University Press, 2003); co-author (with Paul Peterson) of The Education Gap: Vouchers and Urban Schools (Brookings Institution Press, 2002); co-author (with John Coleman and Ken Goldstein) of an introductory American politics textbook series; and editor of additional volumes on the presidency and school boards. His research also has appeared in numerous professional journals and edited volumes.

He has published about presidential power and education policy in various media outlets including the New York Times and the Wall Street Journal. Howell has published in scholarly journals including the American Journal of Political Science, American Political Science Review, International Organization, Presidential Studies Quarterly, Foreign Affairs, Journal of Policy Analysis and Management, and Journal of Politics. Howell has been a consultant for the ABC News election decision team since 2013.

== Awards ==
- Inaugural Recipient, Legacy Award for a book, essay or article published at least 10 years prior to the award year that has made a continuing contribution to the intellectual development of the fields of presidency and executive politics (2015), by the American Political Science Association. (Awarded for Power Without Persuasion).
- Recipient, William Riker Award for the best book in political economy published in the last three years (2014), by the American Political Science Association. (Awarded for The Wartime President).
- Recipient, Richard E. Neustadt Award for the best reference book on the American Presidency published in the previous four years (2010), by the American Political Science Association. (Awarded for the Oxford Handbook on the American Presidency).
- Recipient, D.B. Hardeman Prize for the best book on a congressional topic published in the previous year (2008), by the Lyndon Baines Johnson Presidential Library. (Awarded for While Dangers Gather).
- Recipient, Richard E. Neustadt Award for the best book on the American Presidency published in the previous year (2008), by the American Political Science Association. (Awarded for While Dangers Gather).
- Recipient, Patrick J. Fett Award for the best paper on the scientific study of Congress and the presidency (2005), by the Midwest Political Science Association.
- Distinguished Research Faculty Associate and C. Douglas Dillon Scholar, Weatherhead Center for International Affairs, Harvard University, 2004-2005.

== Select bibliography ==
- Thinking about the Presidency: The Primacy of Power (with David Milton Brent) ISBN 9781400846719
- The Wartime President (with Saul Jackman and Jon Rogowski) ISBN 9780226048253
- While Dangers Gather: Congressional Checks on Presidential War Powers (with Jon C.W. Pevehouse) ISBN 9781400840830
- Power without Persuasion: The Politics of Direct Presidential Action. ISBN 9780691102702
- The Education Gap: Vouchers and Urban Schools. ISBN 0815736851
- Besieged: School Boards and the Future of Education Politics. Washington, D.C.: Brookings Institution Press, 2005. ISBN 0815736843
