= Portfolio strategy =

The portfolio strategy is a method for continuously improving educational opportunities in urban K-12 school systems. The strategy entails managing a portfolio of schools by separating school oversight from school operations and by holding a school's status as contingent, rather than permanent, based on the school's performance.

The portfolio strategy in practice can be reduced to seven interrelated components: choice, autonomy, talent, varied supports, accountability, funding, and public engagement.

Several education systems have adopted a portfolio strategy, including New Orleans, Hartford, Cleveland, Baltimore, Lawrence, and Denver.
