= John Goodlad =

John I. Goodlad (August 19, 1920 – November 29, 2014) was an educational researcher and theorist who published influential models for renewing schools and teacher education. Goodlad's book, In Praise of Education (1997), defined education as a fundamental right in democratic societies, essential to developing individual and collective democratic intelligence. Goodlad designed and promoted several educational reform programs, and conducted major studies of educational change. Books he authored or co-authored include The Moral Dimensions of Teaching, Places Where Teachers Are Taught, Teachers for Our Nation's Schools, and Educational Renewal: Better Teachers, Better Schools.

Goodlad published over 30 books, 80 book chapters, and more than 200 journal articles. His best known book, A Place Called School (1984), received the Outstanding Book of the Year Award from the American Educational Research Association and the Distinguished Book of the Year Award from Kappa Delta Pi. He was a past president of the American Educational Research Association and, in 1993, received that organization's Award for Distinguished Contributions to Educational Research.

Goodlad was born in 1920, Canada, where he attended graduate school and taught in a one-room rural school in British Columbia. In 1949, he earned a Ph.D. from the University of Chicago. Goodlad served on the faculty at Emory University, University of Chicago, University of California at Los Angeles, and was a professor emeritus of education and co-director of the Center for Educational Renewal at the University of Washington. He died November 29, 2014, in Seattle, Washington. John Goodlad was the former dean of University of California, Los Angeles Graduate School of Education.

Educational offices
| Preceded by Julian Stanley | President of the American Educational Research Association; 1967–1968 | Succeeded by David Krathwohl |
