= Tracking (education) =

Separation of students by ability

Tracking, phasing or streaming is the grouping of students by academic ability for all subjects or certain classes and curriculum within a school. Track assignment is typically based on academic ability, such as test scores, but other factors often influence placement.

In a tracking system, the entire school population is assigned to classes according to whether the students' overall achievement is above average, normal, or below average. Students attend academic classes only with students whose overall academic achievement is the same as their own. Tracking remains a controversial practise due to the positive and negative effects for advantaged and disadvantaged learners respectively, and some schools have led efforts to detrack their curricula.

Tracking generally applies to comprehensive schools, while selective school systems assign the students to different schools. Students with special educational needs may be tracked into a self-contained classroom or a separate special school, rather than being included in a mixed-ability class.

== Contrasted with temporary ability grouping ==
Ability grouping is not synonymous with tracking. Tracking differs from ability grouping by scale and permanence. Ability groups are small, informal groups formed within a single classroom. Assignment to an ability group is often short-term (never lasting longer than one school year), and varies by subject. Assignment to an ability group is made by (and can be changed at any time by) the individual teacher, and is usually not recorded in student records. For example, a teacher may divide a typical mixed-ability classroom into three ability groups for a mathematics lesson: those who need to review basic facts before proceeding, those who are ready to learn new material, and those who need a challenging assignment. For the next lesson, the teacher may revert to whole-class, mixed-ability instruction, or may assign students to different ability groups.

== History in the United States ==
=== Background ===
Tracking and its various modifications are among the predominant organizing practices of American public schools, and have been an accepted feature of the country's schools for nearly a century.

Coming into use at a time when schools were enrolling growing numbers of immigrant children as the result of compulsory schooling laws, tracking was adopted as a means of sorting those children viewed as having limited preparation or capacity for schooling from native children. Unfortunately, however, tracking quickly took on the appearance of internal segregation.

The types of tracks have changed over the years. Traditionally, there were academic, general, and vocational tracks, identified by the kind of preparation they provide. By the 1920s, some schools had developed up to eight distinctly labeled tracks that represented particular curricular programs that reflected an assessment of students’ probable social and vocational futures.

Many secondary schools now base track levels on course difficulty, with tracks such as basic, honors, or college-prep. Public schools might track in terms of high, average, or lower ability. As noted by Oakes and Martin, "school policies determine three structural qualities of the tracking system: extensiveness (the number of subjects tracked and the type of distinct curricula offered); specificity (the number of track levels offered); and flexibility (whether students move from one track to another)".

=== Origins of race-based tracking in school desegregation ===
The origins of race-based tracking reach as far back as the federal court ruling in Roberts v. The City of Boston in 1850, a case that upheld separate school curricula for blacks and whites on the belief in inherent racial differences in intelligence. With the Brown v. Board of Education of Topeka Supreme Court ruling of 1954, which determined that the separate school statute established by Plessy v. Ferguson was unconstitutional, the stage was set to address between-school segregation/tracking. However, for schools in most southern regions of the United States, integration did not occur until the early 1970s. Moreover, desegregation at the school level often led to pronounced tracking within schools, as Grant ([1990] 1988) chronicled in The World We Created at Hamilton High. Haney's (1978) historical analysis at the secondary school level found that less qualified teachers were assigned to teach racially tracked classes.

During the mid- to late-1980s, federal court cases in Mississippi and Georgia took up the question of unfair race-based tracking in school systems. However, Quarles v. Oxford Municipal Separate School District, NAACP v. Georgia, and Montgomery v. Starkville Municipal Separate School District each ruled in favor of school districts based on the argument that tracking was being properly utilized for the purpose of assisting students’ ability to learn—in spite of statistical imbalances in track assignment.

In Mickelson's (2003) detailed study of between and within school tracking/segregation in Charlotte North Carolina, she argued that tracking was used as a tool to maintain white privilege by placing African-American students in lower academic tracks. Other studies by Lewis and Diamond (2015), Kelly (2009), Riegle-Crumb, Kyte, and Morton (2018), Schuhrer, Carbonaro, & Grodsky (2016), and others continue to show large disparities in course taking among whites and minorities. The baseline chances of being in the high track are often twice as high for whites as for disadvantaged minorities.

== Track assignment ==
The ways by which students are assigned to tracks differs both between and within schools. Today, it is less common for schools to rigidly track students in all subjects. Administrators and teachers in a given school may purposefully avoid using the term “tracking” to describe the organization of their school's curriculum. Yet, schools maintain a variety of policies that sort students into different programs of study including: test scores and grade requirements, pre- and co-requisite requirements, and teacher recommendations. Schools also use over-arching programs of study such as “college prep” as a guidance technique to track students. Non-academic factors such as schedule conflicts can limit students from taking courses of varying level as well. Thus, while most systems allow for some amount of student and parent choice, this choice is constrained by course taking requirements and guidance policies. Within the context of this system, researchers disagree over the extent to which highly involved parents intervene to give their own student a course taking advantage.

Historically, high school students were sorted into “business/vocational,” “general,” or the “college” track, which had profound implications for the nature and extent of academic course taking. In more recent decades, vocational course taking has declined, while academic course taking has increased. For example, Domina and Saldana (2012) report that the graduating class of 1982 took an average of 14.6 academic courses while the class of 2004 took 19.1 academic courses. Likewise, the percentage of students graduating with pre-calculus or calculus coursework increased from about 10.3% of students to 32.9% of students. This increase in academic course taking, especially in the public sector, has narrowed the differences in academic rigor between high- and low-track students somewhat. Academic intensification has also reduced differences in the academic experiences of public vs. private school students.

Despite some loosening of high school tracking systems, most schools remain highly differentiated, with policies that encourage students to take the same level of coursework in different subjects. In a study of high school tracking policies in North Carolina, Kelly and Price (2011) report that the typical school had five or more levels of mathematics, with some schools having three or more levels of Geometry alone. Larger schools and schools with a greater diversity of student achievement level have more extensive tracking systems than smaller, homogenous schools. In many schools the track assignment process remains a high stakes decision.

== Debate ==
=== Advantages ===
Proponents of tracking say that tracking has several important strengths.

==== Lessons meeting the ability level of students ====
A major advantage of tracking is that it allows teachers to better direct lessons toward the specific ability level of the students in each class. While tracking for regular instruction makes no real difference in scholastic achievement for low and average ability students, it does produce substantial gains for gifted students in tracks specially designed for the gifted and talented.

Tracking meets the need for highly gifted students to be with their intellectual peers in order to be appropriately challenged and to view their own abilities more realistically. Tracking can allow students to receive lessons targeted at their ability for each subject separately, attending lessons set at different levels at the same school. For example, a student at a higher level in math may attend a class with advanced math students, but if at a lower level in English they may be grouped with peers at their level in English.

Another positive aspect of tracking is that since it separates students by ability, students' work is only compared to that of similar-ability peers, preventing a possible lowering of their self-esteem that could result from comparisons with the work of higher ability students, or inflating the egos of the high-ability students when compared to low-ability, same-age students. Being with students of similar ability could allow students to realistically compete against one another for the highest marks with a reasonable chance of reaching the top of a class.

==== Higher achievement of high-ability students ====
Supporters of tracking also note that it allows for higher achievement of high-ability students. Kulik and Kulik (1992) found that high-ability students in tracked classes achieved more highly than similar-ability students in non-tracked classes. Similarly, Rogers (1991) recommends that gifted and talented students spend the majority of their school day with ability peers.

In 1982 and 1990, the Kuliks also found a moderate improvement in attitude toward subject material for all ability levels. Another factor of ability grouping that has been advocated is the Joplin Plan that refers directly to ability grouping for reading. These groups are generally more interchangeable and less defined. In another study, Argys, Rees, and Brewer (1996) found that high-track students’ achievement dropped when lower-ability students were integrated into the same class.

Both of these studies suggest that tracking is beneficial to high-track students. Tracking can also encourage low-ability students to participate in class since tracking separates them from intimidation of the high-ability students.

Some supporters of tracking also view tracking as an effective means of allocation since it helps direct students into specific areas of the labor market.

Rogers classifies tracking as one of ten types of grouping. High-ability groups are often assigned special work that is more advanced than that of the other students in the class. For gifted children, such advanced work contributes to their social and emotional well-being.

=== Disadvantages ===
==== Heterogeneity inside tracks ====
Despite the positive aspects of tracking, some scholars have noted limitations of the system. Tracking often does not work as effectively as it should because of the composition of the tracks. In practice, tracks are generally not as homogeneous as they could be (although they are more homogenous than a non-tracking system, which randomly assigns students to classrooms), so some of the potential benefits can't be fully exploited.

Even when tracks initially are nearly homogeneous in students' academic abilities, heterogeneity can develop over time, since students learn at different rates. Some systems reassess all students periodically to keep students of comparable ability together as they progress.

==== Racial and social discrimination ====
Low-track classes tend to be primarily composed of low-income students, usually minorities, while upper-track classes are usually dominated by students from socioeconomically successful groups.

In 1987, Jeannie Oakes theorized that the disproportionate placement of poor and minority students into low tracks does not reflect their actual learning abilities. Rather, she argues that the ethnocentric claims of social Darwinists and the Anglo-Saxon-driven Americanization movement at the turn of the century combined to produce a strong push for "industrial" schooling, ultimately relegating the poorer minority students to vocational programs and a differentiated curriculum which she considered a lingering pattern in 20th century schools.

==== Teachers' appointment to classes ====
In 1984, Merrilee Finley's ethnographic study of “suburban high school” drew attention to the practice of teacher tracking—the matching of teachers to tracked classrooms. Finley found that at suburban, advanced, high-track classes were considered by teachers to be the most desirable classes to teach, and were taught by the most experienced, highly trained, and motivated teachers. Using nationally representative data Kelly (2004) confirmed Finley's findings, arguing that teacher tracking perpetuates educational inequality by placing the least effective teachers in the most challenging teaching contexts. Teacher tracking also maintains the practice of student tracking, because all but the newest teachers are invested in the informal reward system created by teacher tracking. Analyses of state administrative data by Clotfelter et al. (2006), Kalogrides et al. (2013) and others continue to show uneven access to high quality teachers within schools.

==== Curricula ====
Scholars have found that curricula often vary widely among tracks, as teachers adjust instruction to match student achievement levels. However, while the enrichment and/or acceleration of curricula is considered to be a major benefit to high-track students, lessons taught in low-track classes often lack the engagement and rigor of the high-track lessons, even considering that low-track students may enter class with lower academic achievement.

Oakes (1985) found that in high-track classes, teachers often used course materials and taught concepts which required extensive critical-thinking skills, whereas teachers in low-track classes tended to draw heavily from workbooks and rarely assign work that required critical thinking. In general, curricula of high-track courses are much more intensive and in-depth than those of low-track courses, as would be expected by differences in students' academic readiness. Teachers also report spending less time addressing disciplinary issues in high-track classrooms than in low-track classes, which leads to differences in content coverage. Importantly, research finds that instructional differences across track levels goes beyond what would be expected based simply on differences in student readiness. For example, In English language arts classes, Northrop and Kelly (2018) found that in 8th grade low-track students read less challenging texts than students of similar achievement in grade-level classes, part of a pattern of more skill and strategy instruction and less literature analysis.

==== Social effects and stigmatization ====
Some studies suggest that tracking can influence students' peer groups and attitudes regarding other students. Gamoran's study (1992) shows that students are more likely to form friendships with other students in the same tracks than students outside of their tracks. Since low-class and minority students are overrepresented in low tracks with Whites and Asians generally dominating high tracks, interaction among these groups can be discouraged by tracking. However, there is no research showing an academic benefit to low track students from such interaction.

Tracking can also result in a stigmatization of low-track students. In some cases, this stigmatization is thought to have a negative impact on students' academic performance and to influence students' attitudes. In one study, it was found that, among low-achieving students, students in tracked classes were more likely than students in non-tracked classes to believe that "their fate was out of their hands". According to Carol Dweck's book Mindset: The New Psychology of Success, this could be because their teachers impose upon them a 'fixed mindset,' but it is not an inherent attribute of tracking itself.

Dweck implies that teachers who promote a growth mindset could stimulate students to greater academic achievement regardless of tracking. So whether a fixed mindset is predictive of, or resulting from, a low track assignment is unknown.

Colin Lacey (1970) argues that tracking causes a differentiation and a subsequent polarization into pro-school and anti-school subcultures. During tracking, students are differentiated in the different sets, with those put in higher sets getting the message that the school regards them as better students, and those in lower sets getting the message that the school regards them as worse students. They therefore polarize into separate and differing student subcultures. Those in the higher sets form pro-school subcultures, because they respect the school which has given them status by putting them in a higher set, and because they are spending more of their time with other students who are likewise positive towards school due to being given status. In contrast, those in lower sets, having been denied status by the school by being placed in a lower set, form anti-school subcultures, whereby they attain status by alternative means, typically by inverting the school's values. These anti-school subcultures are not conducive to education, because they are against education, and so students continue to do worse in school, strengthening their anti-school values. Tracking therefore worsens the education of those placed in lower sets.

The effects of social stigmatization can be some of the worst outcomes for students in lower academic tracks. Schafer and Olexa (1971) interviewed high school students in lower academic tracks to examine the effects of tracking on self-esteem and perceived academic competence. They found that students lost confidence in their abilities by their placements in low-ability classes in which teacher expectations for them were low.

These dilemmas were very common as students made transitions to new schools (e.g., elementary to middle school, middle to high school). The tracking of African-American students in elementary schools reflected remnants of early desegregation in which African-American secondary school teachers were demoted to teaching in lower grades (Haney, 1978). In these elementary schools, class-based tracking disproportionately placed African-American students in lower tracks with African-American teachers, regardless of ability. In transitions to middle and high school, tracking by ability created a division among these students and stripped students in lower tracks of their perceived academic efficacies.

Goodlad (1983) and Oakes (1985) found that students in lower tracks were more likely to drop out of school or participate in criminal activities.

Proponents of tracking would have said that students dropped out due to lack of ability, but Mickelson (2003) stated that students differed widely even within lower tracks. Even when students demonstrated high academic ability, it was virtually impossible to change their academic tracks without delaying high school graduation (Mickelson, 2003).

== International perspective ==
=== Background ===
Across countries there are wide differences in the use of formal tracking systems. Even though some countries track students into differing-ability schools by age 10, others such as the United States keep their entire secondary-school system comprehensive. Eric Hanushek and Ludger Woessmann identify the impact of tracking by comparing differences in student outcome between primary and secondary school across tracked and non-tracked systems. The results suggest that early tracking increases educational inequality. While less clear, there is also a tendency for early tracking to reduce mean performance.

=== Tracking by country ===
Tracking was once popular in English-speaking countries, but is less used now; tracking systems formed the basis of the Tripartite System in England and Wales until the 1970s, and in Northern Ireland until 2009.

In the UK, the term "tracking" refers to recording data as to individual pupils progress; the term "streaming" connotes tracking in the sense of this article.

Weak tracking systems have been used in American schools. In this approach, local schools assign students to classrooms according to their overall achievement, so that a given classroom is primarily composed of students with either high, average, or low academic achievement.

Germany uses a tracked system. In Germany, students' achievements in their last of generally four years of primary school determine the type of secondary school they will be permitted to attend, and therefore the type of education they will receive.

A tracking system has been in place since the advent of modern education in the Netherlands. After it was relaxed in the 70s and 80s, the tracking system has been gaining substantial strength again since the late 1990s.

In Switzerland, at the end of primary school (or at the beginning of secondary school), pupils are separated (see Indicator C for Fribourg under Primary School) according to their capacities and career-intentions in several (often three) sections for a period of 2–3 years (Sekundarschule) in either Pre-higher secondary school section, General section, or Basic section (Basic may be called Realschule in German or Classe d'exigence de base in French). Students who aspire for an academic career enter Mittelschule (also named Gymnasium, or Kantonsschule, a public school by the canton/state) to be prepared for further studies and the Matura (normally obtained after 12 or 13 years of school usually at the age of 18 or 19). Students intending to pursue a trade or vocation complete three to four additional years before entering Vocational Educations. This so-called "dual system" splitting academic and vocational training has its continuation in the higher education system. While the academic training leads to the matura and free admission to universities, successfully completed vocational education gives access to third level of practical education, the Höhere Fachschule (Schweiz).

== Detracking ==
Detracking occurs when students are deliberately positioned into classes of mixed ability. As opposed to tracking, students are no longer placed in groups based upon academic achievement or ability. Tracking can be associated with giving students in low-track classes less resources, fewer experienced teachers, low expectations, and unchallenging curricula. Proponents for detracking believe that low-track students will greatly benefit in school achievement if they are mixed in with high-track students.

Critics of tracking such as Kevin Welner say that detracking will help close the class-based and race-based achievement gap. Often students in low-track classes are disadvantaged racial and ethnic minority students. Those in favor of detracking say that detracking challenges social views about race and intelligence.

Tracking has been shown to produce less academic achievement for low-ability students, and higher academic achievement for high-ability students; de-tracking would increase the achievement of the worst students and harm the achievement of the best students. Critics say that not challenging all students with the most advanced curriculum results in overall low student educational achievement, and that students in low tracks do not learn as much as their peers in higher tracks, e.g., advanced mathematics.

Teachers typically have higher expectations for students in high-track classes and low expectations for students in low-tracked classes, which affects the self-image of students.

=== Criticism of detracking ===
The evidence of the negative effects of detracking on gifted/highly capable learners is mixed and complex. For example, in schools where gifted learner programming is focused on content acceleration, the evidence supports that higher-tracked students achievements suffer. However, in mixed environments which feature more project-based learning and critical thinking, the results for heterogeneously grouped learners increases at all ability levels. Parents of high-ability students and other proponents of tracking say that academically gifted students should have access to classes that maximize their potential. One argument holds that detracking inhibits high-ability students because teachers must reduce the amount and complexity of material so that all students in the class, including low-ability students, can understand it.

The teachers' perception of a students' academic abilities often influences how detracking is carried out in the classroom. Systemic bias and educator bias is a problematic issue in education generally, but specifically where tracking is concerned in ability-based grouping. Researcher consistently point to what is known as the Matthew Effect, where social factors and socioeconomic factors are a leading predictor of academic achievement, and likely explains the disparity between white and minority learners in gifted placements. For example, in a school with many disadvantaged students, teachers assumed most students had low ability, and therefore the classroom curriculum was easier than what the students were capable of achieving. On the other side, in a wealthy school, teachers typically assumed students were college-bound and intelligent, and followed a creative and challenging curriculum.

Educator Robert Pondiscio has argued that mixed-ability grouping in the classroom creates problems of its own, especially the neglect of higher-functioning students. He also points out that tracking is routinely used in school sports programs, and questions whether educators are more concerned about athletic achievement than they are about academic achievement.

== Proposed reforms ==
Maureen Hallinan offers many suggestions for reforming the tracking system and counterbalancing its perceived negative consequences. Although tracking can segregate students by race and socioeconomic status, she says that, by ensuring that students are engaged in integrated settings during the school day, some of the negative effects of the segregation could be avoided. Some studies suggest that low-track students often have slower academic growth than high-track students, but Hallinan says that providing more-engaging lessons in class, altering assumptions about students, and raising requirements for students' performance could help. Research is needed in this area to test her hypotheses. In order to prevent stigmatization of low-track students, Hallinan suggests that schools challenge low-track students to achieve highly and should offer public rewards for gains in academic achievement. Such rewards would be necessary in all tracks to avoid the perception of unfairness.

Heterogeneous class assignment with part-time homogeneous groupings is one possible compromise.

Allen Graubard suggests that creating "small schools" within larger school systems would be a progressive proposal for reformation. The school experience could be reformatted by having students select programs themselves that cover both traditional learning as well as vocational real-world experiences.

Reform would also benefit from improving the instruction that is provided to students within the classroom. In order to have all students benefit from eliminating tracking, teachers must have the tools to teach all students, as well as the tools to decrease stigma that may arise from students who feel that they are at different learning levels from their peers. There is evidence that as it stands, many teachers are not given proper training to teach/guide differentiated classrooms. In order to successfully accomplish a reformation of the educational experience, teachers and faculty must be provided the proper time and support to complete training.

== Forms of educational tracking ==
=== Vertical tracking (levels) ===
Vertical tracking (or vertical differentiation) refers to the practice of grouping students into different levels within the same subject (e.g., Remedial English, Honors/AP English)

=== Horizontal tracking (specialisations) ===
Horizontal tracking (or horizontal differentiation) refers to the practice of grouping students into different specialisations within different subjects (e.g., A-Level Economics, A-Level French)

== See also ==
- Differentiated instruction - an alternative to tracking.
- Tripartite System of education in England, Wales and Northern Ireland
- Expertise reversal effect
