= Queens =

Borough and county in New York, US

Queens Queens County, New York
- Borough and county
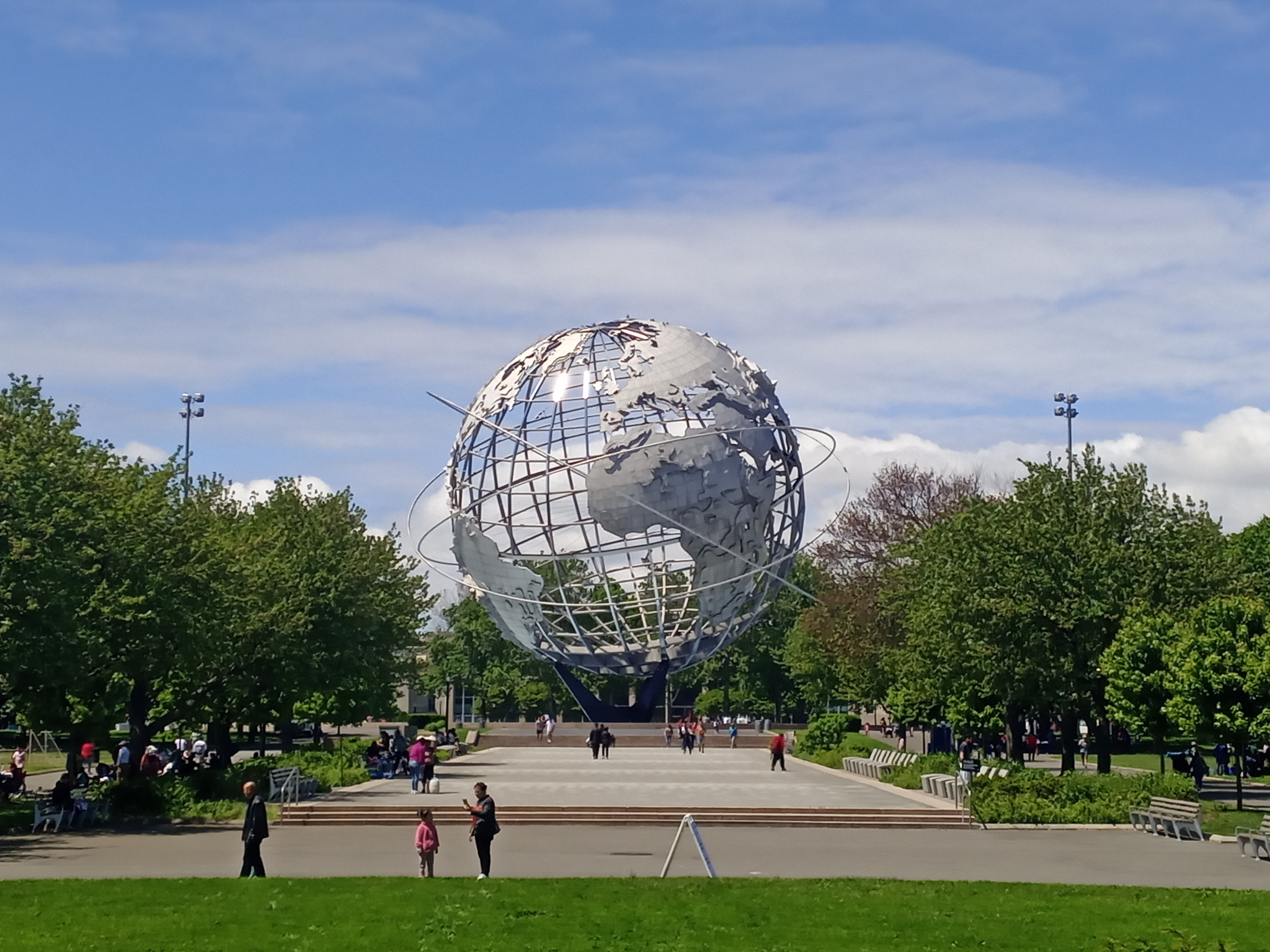
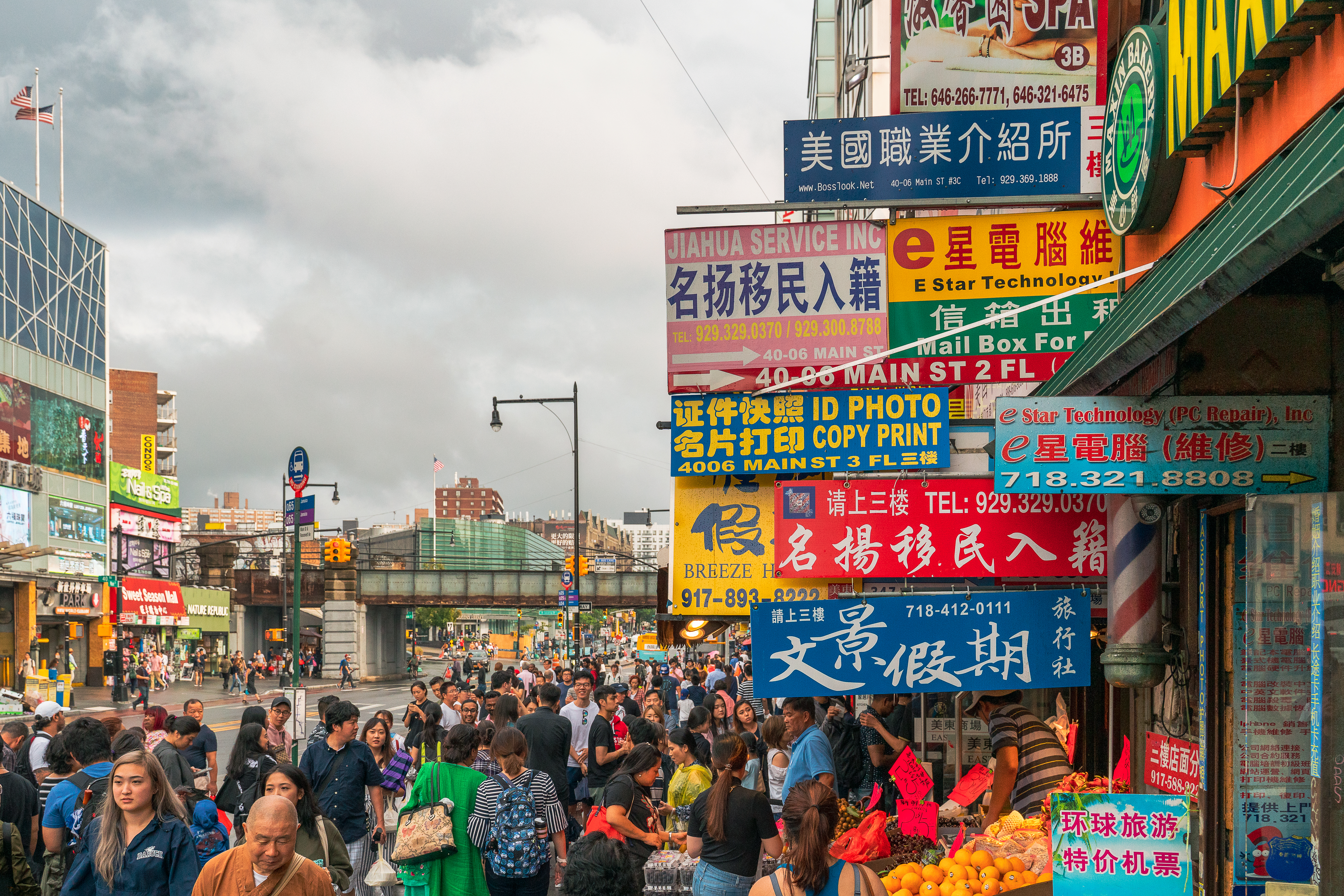
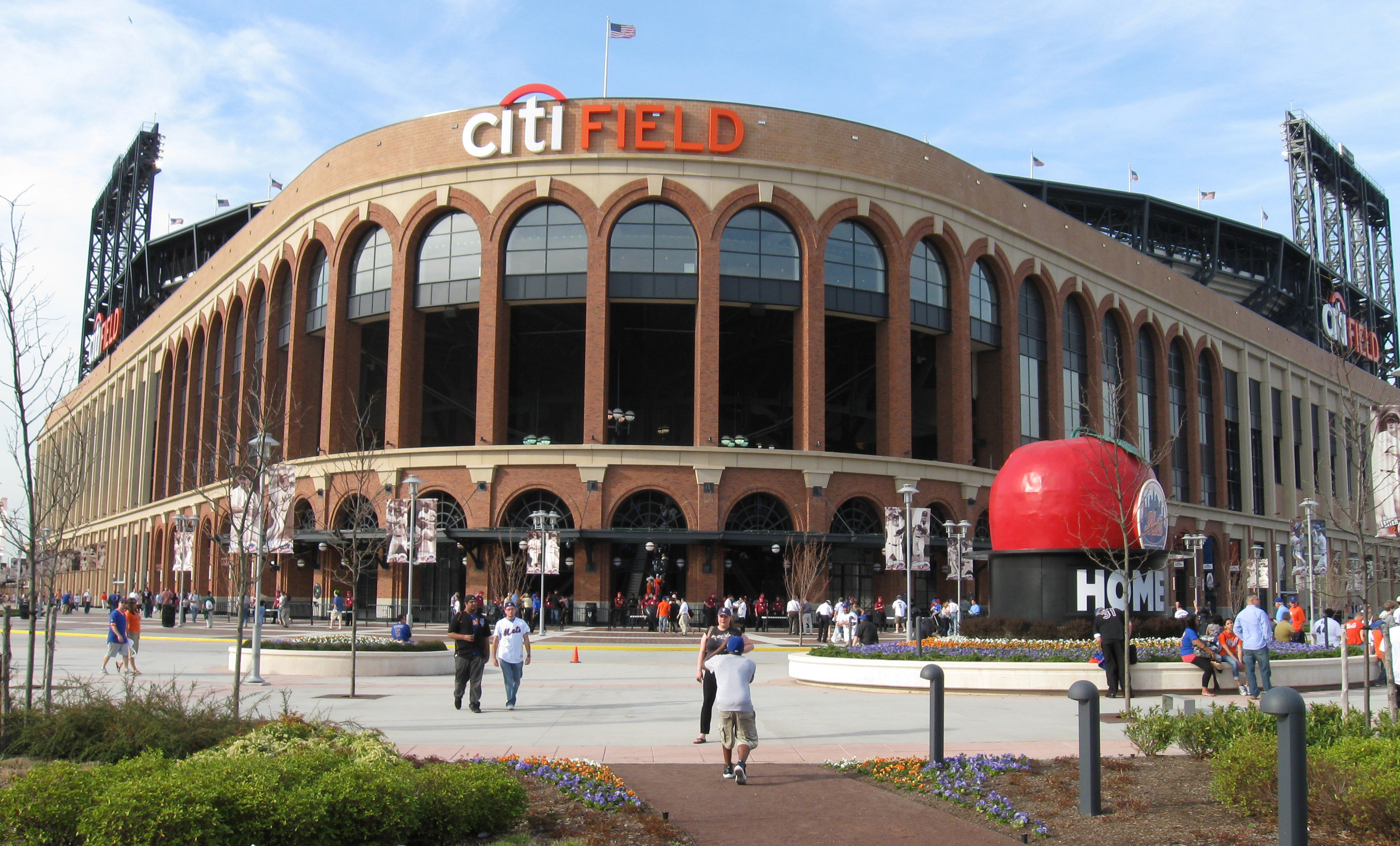
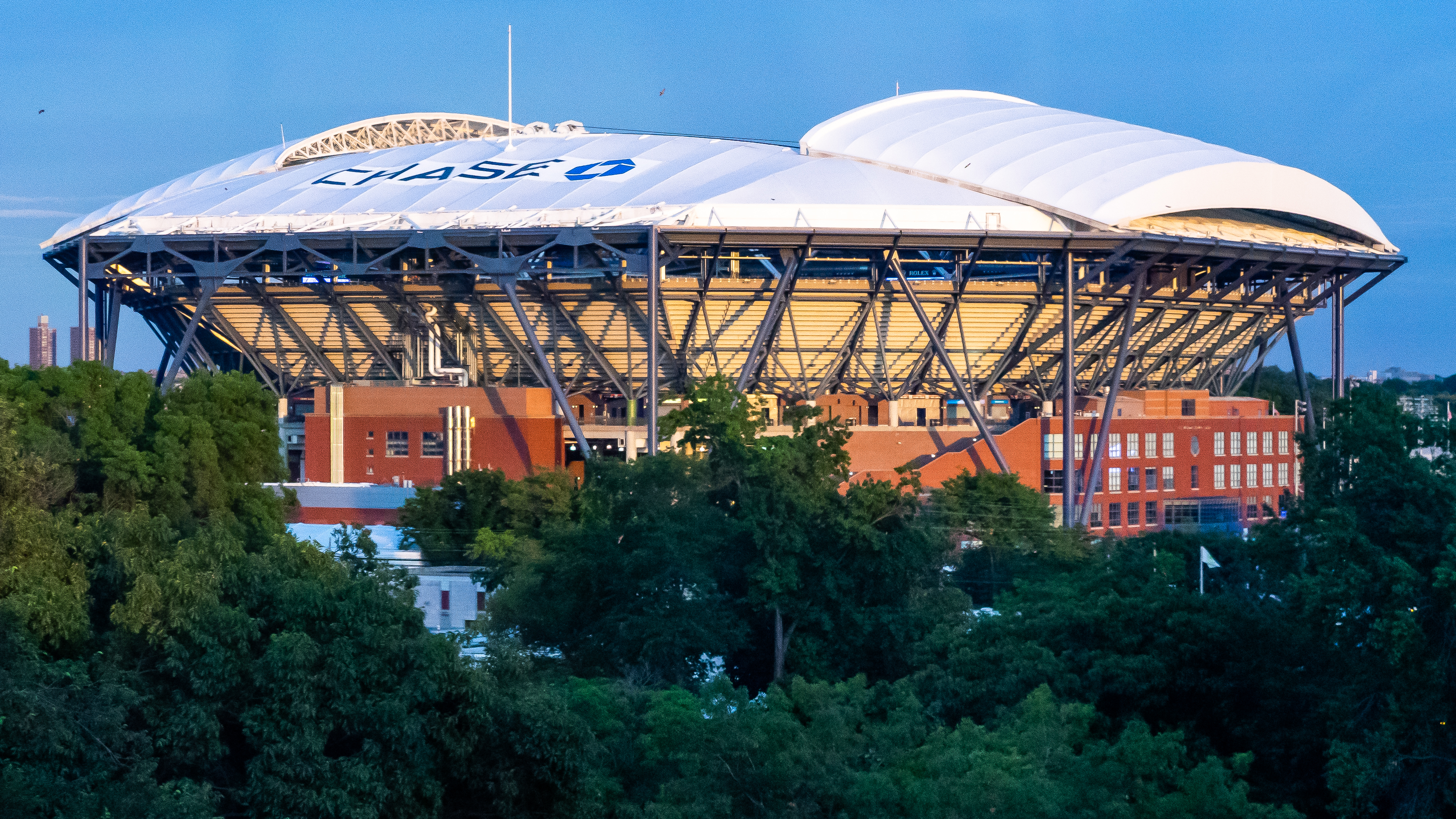
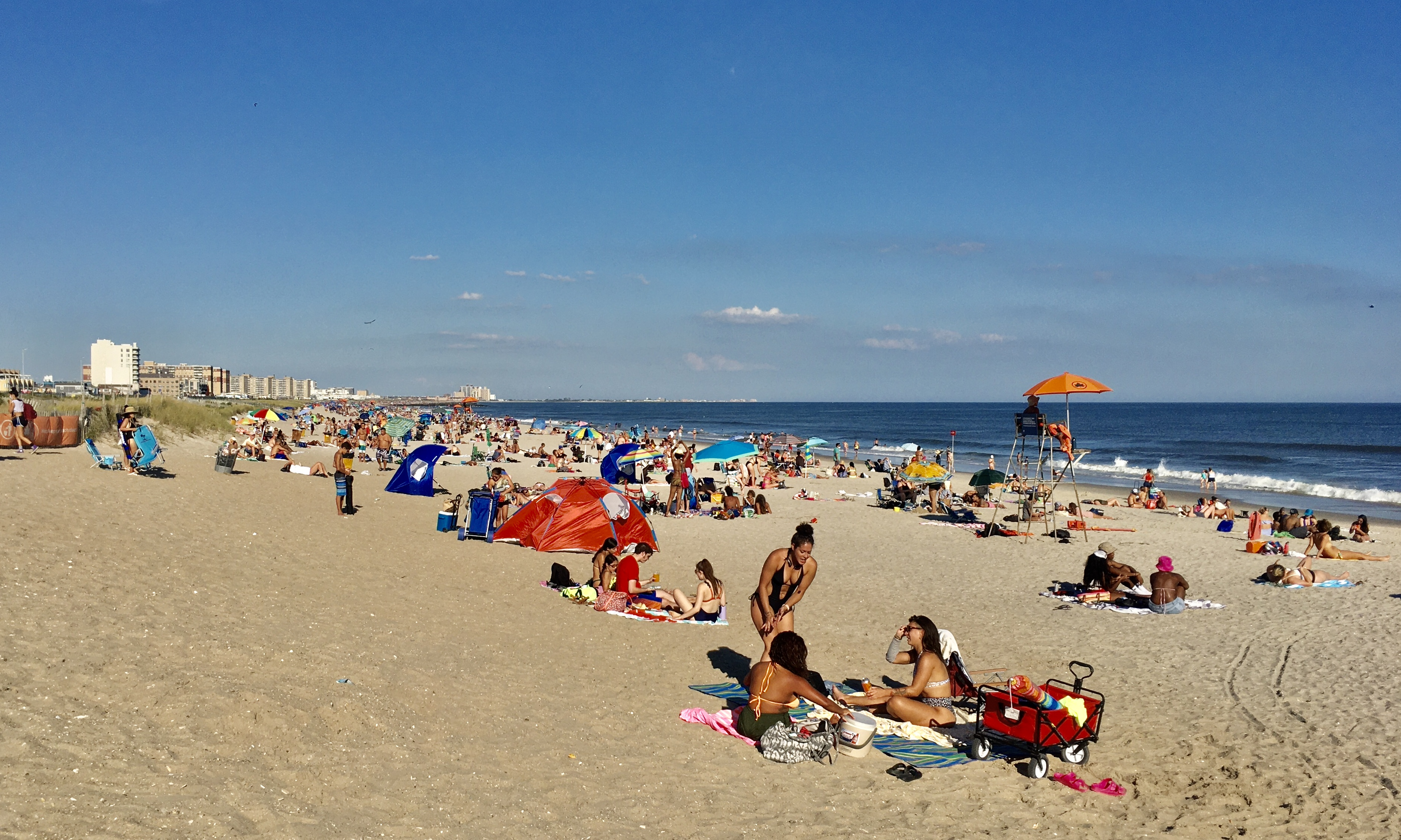
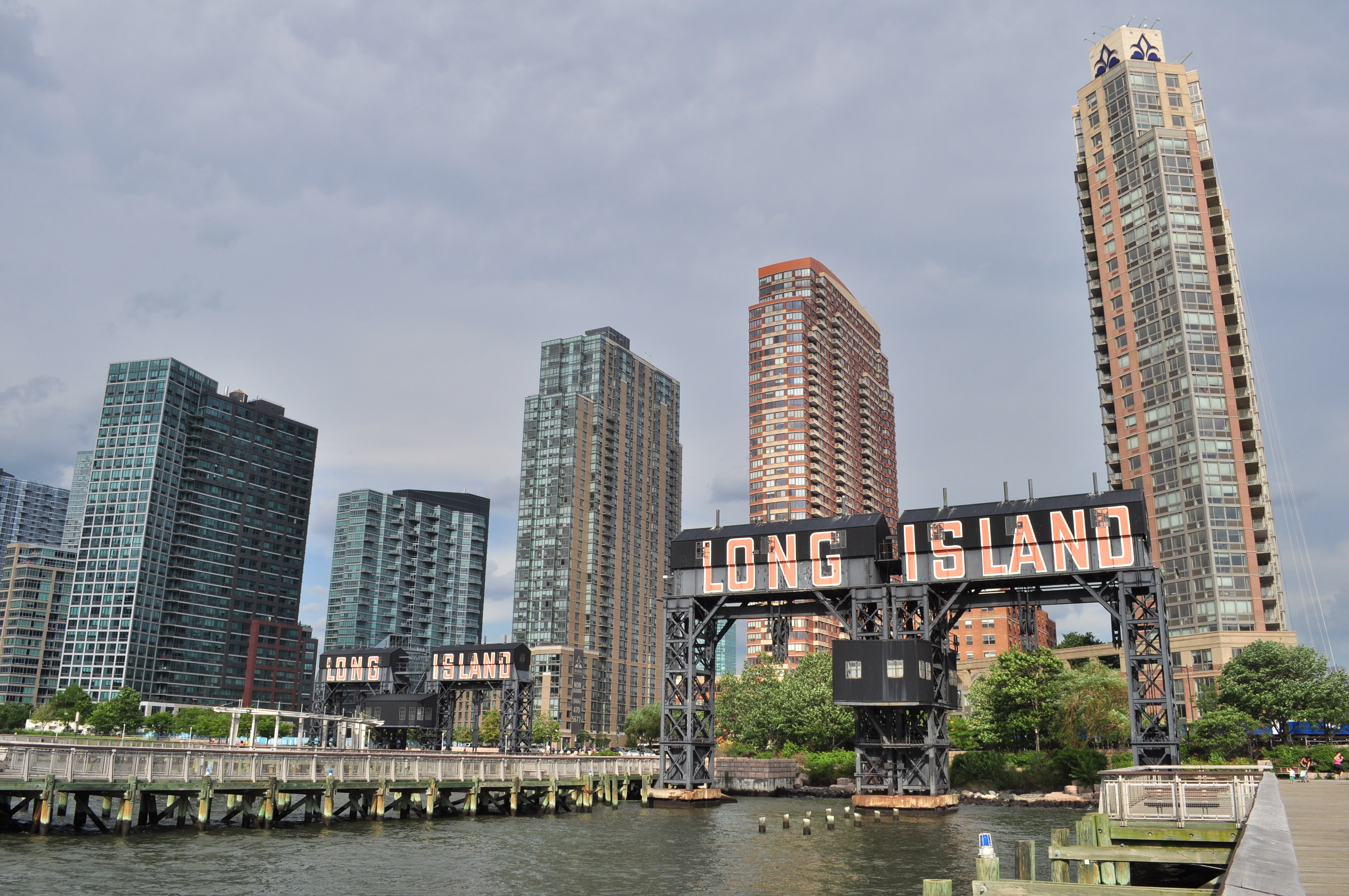
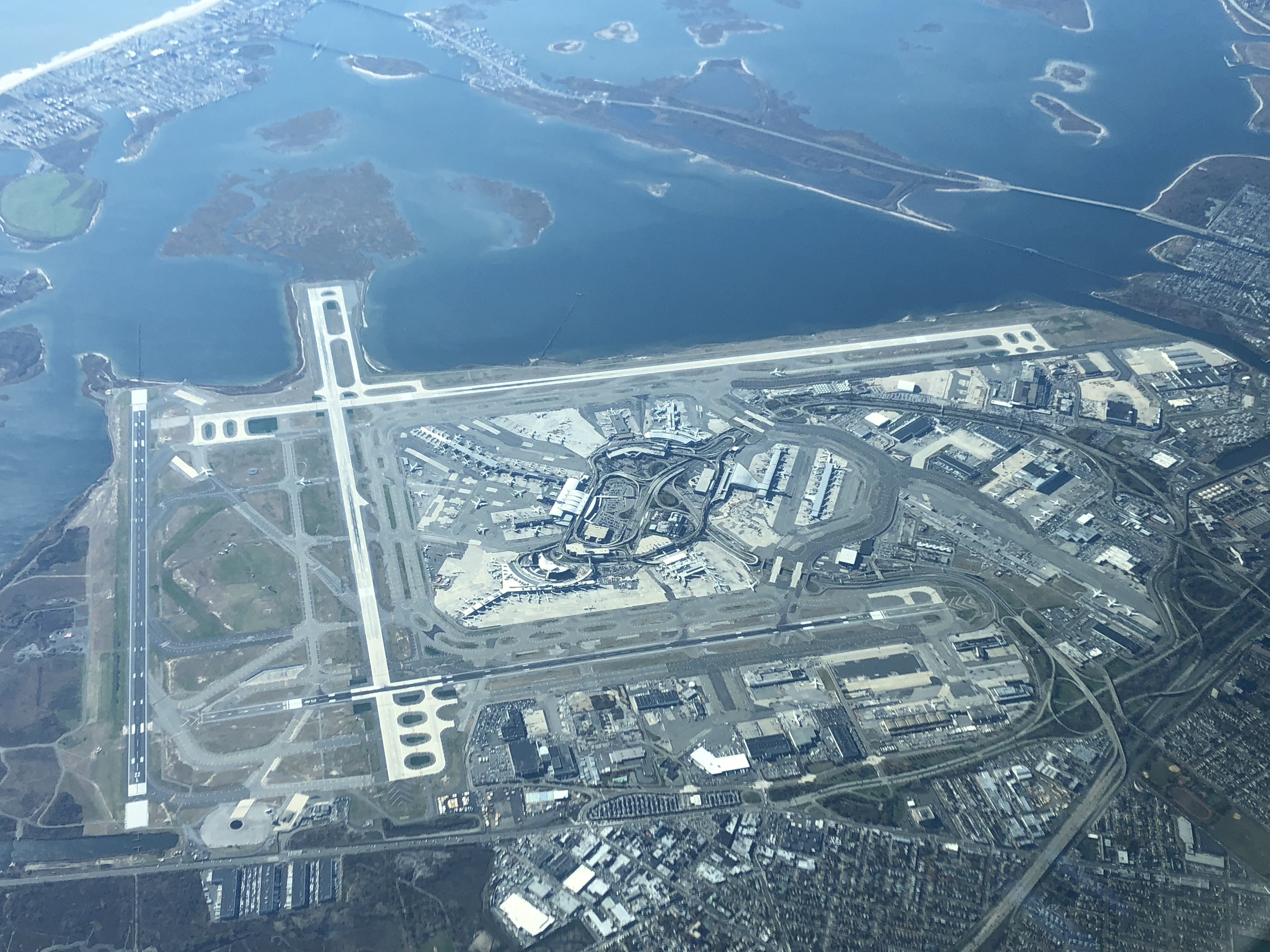
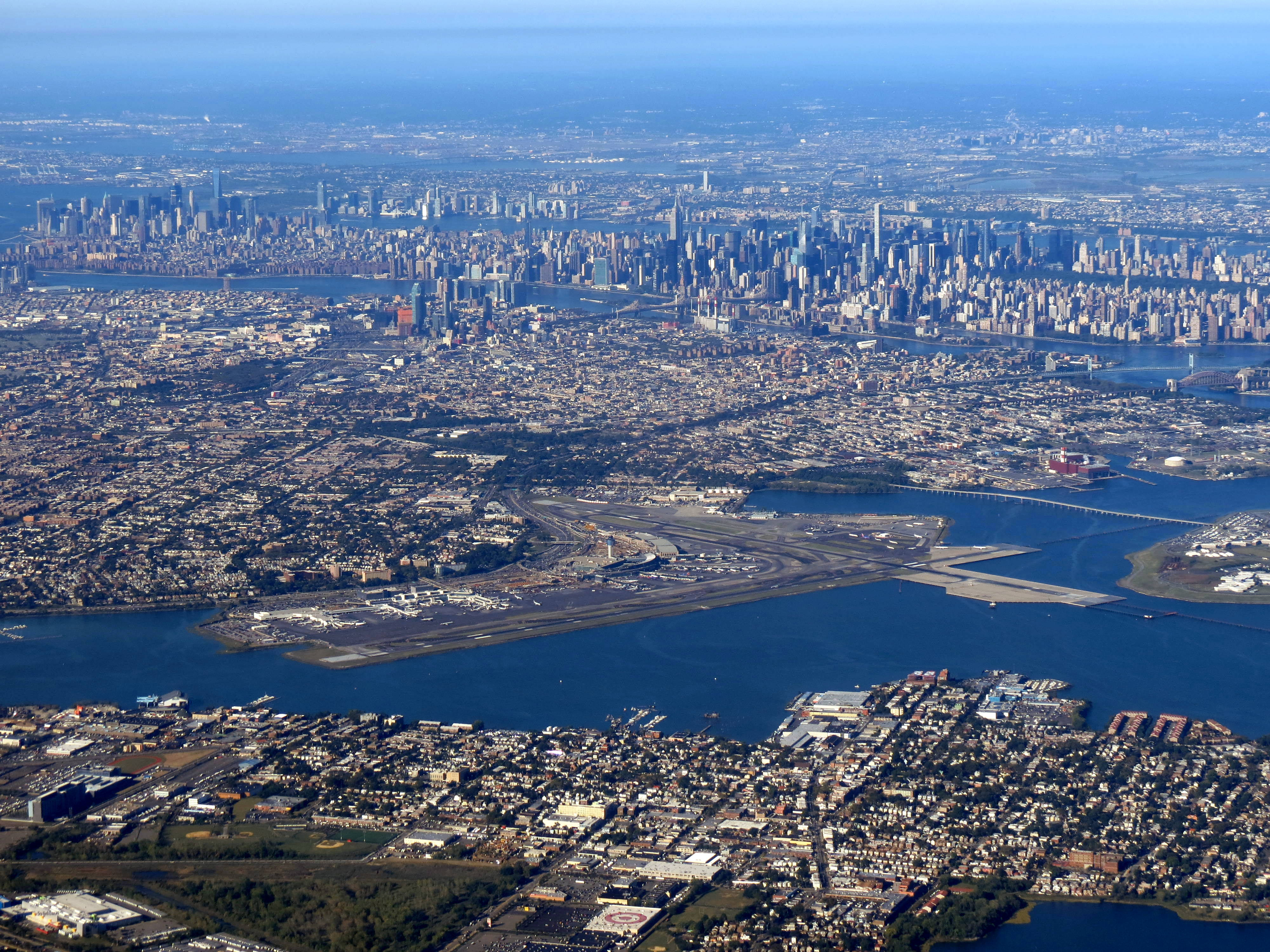
- Unisphere in Flushing Meadows–Corona Park Queensboro Bridge Downtown Flushing Citi Field Arthur Ashe Stadium Rockaway Beach and Boardwalk Gantry Plaza State Park John F. Kennedy International Airport LaGuardia Airport

- Flag Seal
- Interactive map outlining Queens
- Location within New York City Location within New York state Location within the United States Location in the World
- Coordinates: 40°42′49″N 73°49′41″W
- Country: United States
- State: New York
- County: Queens (coterminous)
- City: New York City
- Settled: 1683
- Named for: Catherine of Braganza

Government
  - Type: Borough (New York City)
  - Borough President: Donovan Richards (D) — (Borough of Queens)
  - District Attorney: Melinda Katz (D) — (Queens County)

Area
  - Total: 178 sq mi (460 km^{2})
  - Land: 109 sq mi (280 km^{2})
  - Water: 70 sq mi (180 km^{2}) 39%
- Highest elevation: 258.2 ft (78.7 m)

Population (2020)
  - Total: 2,405,464
  - Estimate (2025): 2,358,182 ▼
  - Density: 22,068/sq mi (8,521/km^{2})
- Demonym: Queensite

GDP
  - Total: US$111.143 billion (2024)
  - Per capita: US$46,954 (2024)
- ZIP Code prefixes: 111--, 113--, 114--, 116--, 11004-5
- Area codes: 718/347/929/465, 917
- Congressional districts: 3rd, 5th, 6th, 7th, 14th
- Website: queensbp.nyc.gov

Queens is the largest by area of the five boroughs of New York City, and the second most populous, with a population of 2,405,464 as of the 2020 census. Since 1899 the borough is coextensive with Queens County, the second-most populous county in New York state, behind Kings County (Brooklyn). If Queens were its own city, it would be the fourth most-populous in the United States, after the other four boroughs of New York City, Los Angeles, and Chicago. Queens is the fourth-most densely populated borough in New York City and the fourth-most densely populated U.S. county.

Located near the western end of Long Island, the borough is bordered by Brooklyn to its west, and by Nassau County to its east, and shares maritime borders with the boroughs of Manhattan, the Bronx, and Staten Island, as well as with New Jersey. Queens is the most linguistically diverse place in the world, as well as one of the most ethnically diverse, with approximately 47% of its residents being foreign-born.

Queens County was established in 1683 as one of the original 12 counties of the Province of New York. The settlement was named after the English Queen and Portuguese royal princess Catherine of Braganza (1638–1705). From 1683 to 1899, Queens County included what is now Nassau County. The Borough of Queens was created during the consolidation of New York City in 1898, combining the towns of Long Island City, Newtown, Flushing, Jamaica, and part of western Hempstead. All except Hempstead are today considered neighborhoods of Queens.

Queens has the most diversified economy among the five boroughs of New York City. It is home to both of New York City's airports: John F. Kennedy and LaGuardia. Among its landmarks are Flushing Meadows–Corona Park; Citi Field, home to the New York Mets baseball team; the USTA Billie Jean King National Tennis Center, site of the U.S. Open tennis tournament; Kaufman Astoria Studios and Silvercup Studios.

== History ==
=== Colonial and post-colonial history ===
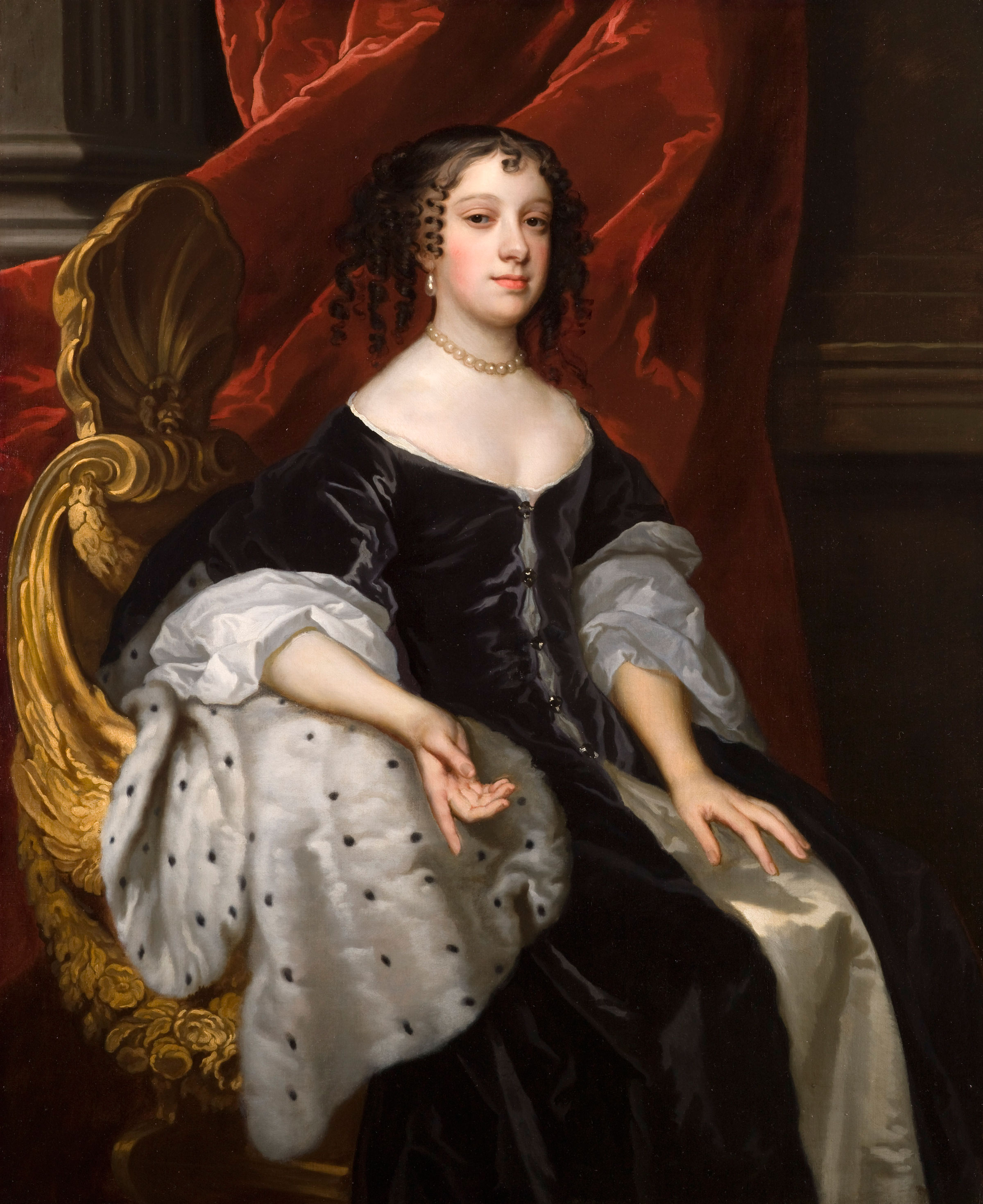
Catherine of Braganza, Queen of England

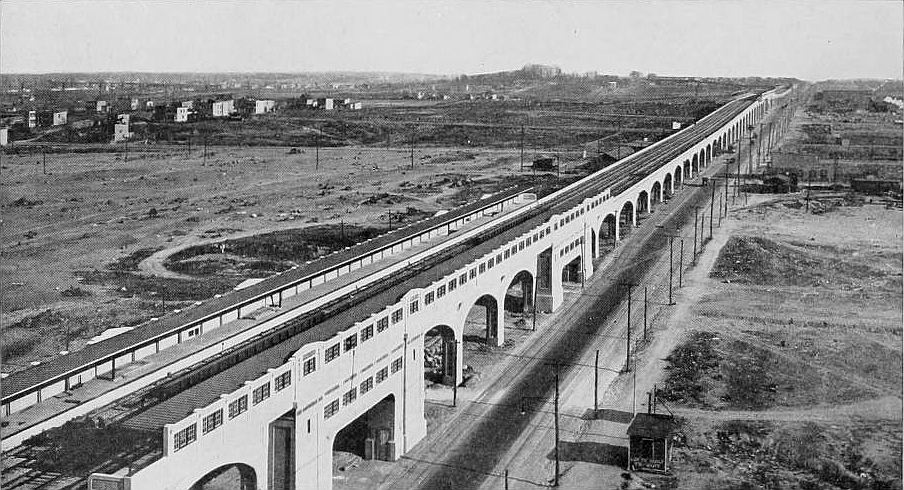
Queens Boulevard, looking east from Van Dam Street, in 1920. The newly built IRT Flushing Line is in the boulevard's median.

The Dutch were the first settlers and established the first European settlement in the region, where they established the colony of New Netherland. The first settlements were established in 1635 followed by further settlement at Maspeth in 1642 (ultimately unsuccessful), and Vlissingen (now Flushing) in 1645. Other early settlements included Newtown (now Elmhurst) in 1652 and Jamaica in 1655. These towns were mostly inhabited by English settlers from New England via eastern Long Island (Suffolk County) who were subject to Dutch law. After the capture of the colony by the English and its subsequent renaming as New York in 1664, the area (and all of Long Island) became known as Yorkshire.

The Flushing Remonstrance signed by colonists in 1657 is considered a precursor to the United States Constitution's provision on freedom of religion in the Bill of Rights. The signers protested the Dutch colonial authorities' persecution of Quakers in what is today the borough of Queens.

Originally, Queens County included the adjacent area now comprising Nassau County. It was an original county of New York State, one of twelve created on November 1, 1683. The county is presumed to have been named after Catherine of Braganza, since she was queen of England at the time. She was Portugal's royal princess Catarina, daughter of King John IV of Portugal. The county was founded alongside Kings County (Brooklyn, which was named after her husband, King Charles II), and Richmond County (Staten Island, named after his illegitimate son, the 1st Duke of Richmond).

The namesake is disputed. While Catherine's title seems the most likely namesake, no historical evidence of official declaration has been found. On October 7, 1691, all counties in the Colony of New York were redefined. Queens gained North and South Brother Islands as well as Huletts Island (today known as Rikers Island). On December 3, 1768, Queens gained other islands in Long Island Sound that were not already assigned to a county but that did not abut on Westchester County (today's Bronx County).

Queens played a minor role in the American Revolution, as compared to Brooklyn, where the Battle of Long Island was fought. Queens, like the rest of what became New York City and Long Island, remained under British occupation after the Battle of Long Island in 1776 and was occupied throughout most of the rest of the Revolutionary War. Under the Quartering Act, British soldiers used, as barracks, the public inns and uninhabited buildings belonging to Queens residents. Even though many residents opposed unannounced quartering, they supported the British crown. The quartering of soldiers in private homes, except in times of war, was banned by the Third Amendment to the United States Constitution. Nathan Hale was captured by the British on the shore of Flushing Bay and hanged in Manhattan.

From 1683 until 1784, Queens County consisted of five towns: Flushing, Hempstead, Jamaica, Newtown, and Oyster Bay. On April 6, 1784, a sixth town, the Town of North Hempstead, was formed through secession by the northern portions of the Town of Hempstead. The seat of the county government was located first in Jamaica, but the courthouse was torn down by the British during the American Revolution to use the materials to build barracks. After the war, various buildings in Jamaica temporarily served as courthouse and jail until a new building was erected about 1787 and later completed in an area near Mineola (now in Nassau County) known then as Clowesville.

The 1850 United States census was the first in which the population of the three western towns (Long Island City, Newtown, and Jamaica) exceeded that of the three eastern towns (Hempstead, North Hempstead, and Oyster Bay) that are now part of Nassau County. Concerns were raised about the condition and distance of the old courthouse, and several sites were in contention for the construction of a new one.

In 1870, Long Island City split from the Town of Newtown, incorporating itself as a city, consisting of what had been the village of Astoria and some unincorporated areas within the town of Newtown. Around 1874, the seat of county government was moved to Long Island City from Mineola.

On March 1, 1860, the eastern border between Queens County (later Nassau County) and Suffolk County was redefined with no discernible change. On June 8, 1881, North Brother Island was transferred to New York County. On May 8, 1884, Rikers Island was transferred to New York County.

In 1886, Lloyd's Neck, which was then part of the town of Oyster Bay and had earlier been known as Queens Village, was set off and separated from Queens County and annexed to the town of Huntington in Suffolk County. On April 16, 1964, South Brother Island was transferred to Bronx County.

=== Incorporation as borough ===
The New York City borough of Queens was authorized on May 4, 1897, by a vote of the New York State Legislature after an 1894 referendum on consolidation. The eastern 280 square miles (730 km^{2}) of Queens that became Nassau County was partitioned on January 1, 1899. Queens Borough was established on January 1, 1898.

"The city of Long Island City, the towns of Newtown, Flushing and Jamaica, and that part of the town of Hempstead, in the county of Queens, which is westerly of a straight line drawn through the middle of the channel between Rockaway Beach and Shelter Island, in the county of Queens, to the Atlantic Ocean" was annexed to New York City, dissolving all former municipal governments (Long Island City, the county government, all towns, and all villages) within the new borough. The areas of Queens County that were not part of the consolidation plan, consisting of the towns of North Hempstead and Oyster Bay, and the major remaining portion of the Town of Hempstead, remained part of Queens County until they seceded to form the new Nassau County on January 1, 1899. At this point, the boundaries of Queens County and the Borough of Queens became coterminous. With consolidation, Jamaica once again became the county seat, though county offices now extend to nearby Kew Gardens also.

In 1899, New York City conducted a land survey to determine the exact border of Queens between the Rockaways and Lawrence. This proved difficult because the border was defined as "middle of the channel between Rockaway Beach and Shelter Island" (now called Long Beach Island), and that particular channel had closed up by 1899. The surveyors had to determine where the channel had been when the consolidation law was written in 1894. The surveyors did so in part by speaking with local fishermen and oystermen who knew the area well.

From 1905 to 1908, the Long Island Rail Road in Queens became electrified. Transportation to and from Manhattan, previously by ferry or via bridges in Brooklyn, opened up with the Queensboro Bridge finished in 1909, and with railway tunnels under the East River in 1910. From 1915 onward, much of Queens was connected to the New York City Subway system. With the 1915 construction of the Steinway Tunnel carrying the IRT Flushing Line between Queens and Manhattan, and the robust expansion of the use of the automobile, the population of Queens more than doubled in the 1920s, from 469,042 in 1920 to 1,079,129 in 1930.

In later years, Queens was the site of the 1939 New York World's Fair and the 1964 New York World's Fair. LaGuardia Airport, established on a site in northern Queens that had been a seaplane base, opened in 1939, named for mayor Fiorello La Guardia, who pushed for the development of a modern airport in New York City. Idlewild Airport, in southern Queens, opened in 1948 on the site of a former golf course and was renamed John F. Kennedy International Airport in 1963.

In one of several notable incidents, TWA Flight 800 took off from the airport on July 17, 1996, and exploded in midair off the coast of Long Island, killing all 230 on board the Boeing 747. American Airlines Flight 587 took off from the latter airport on November 12, 2001, but ended up crashing in Belle Harbor, killing all 260 on board and five people on the ground. In late October 2012, much of Breezy Point was damaged by a massive six-alarm fire caused by Hurricane Sandy, the largest fire of residential homes in FDNY history, destroying 126 homes in an area where every building was damaged by either water, wind or the resulting fires.

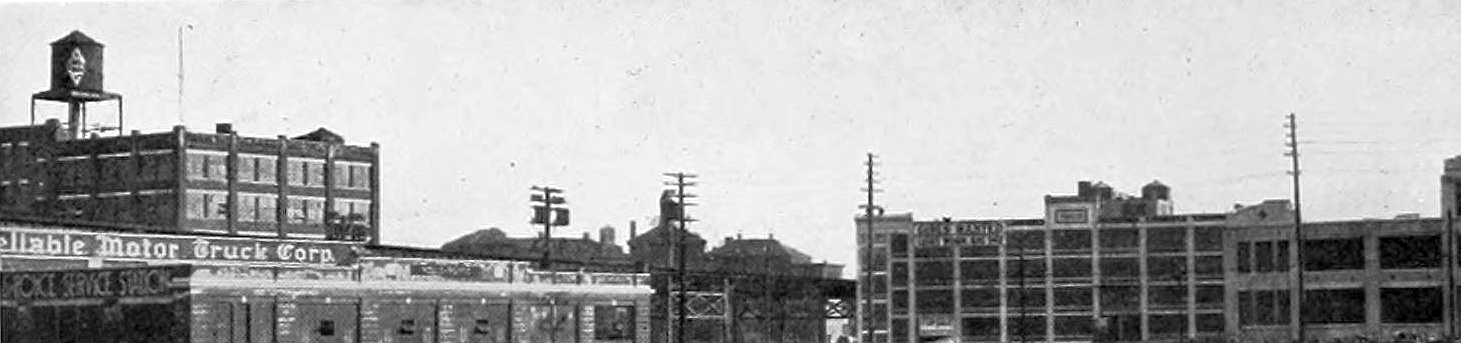
Looking south from the Queensboro Bridge in Long Island City

== Geography ==
The location of Queens (red) within New York City

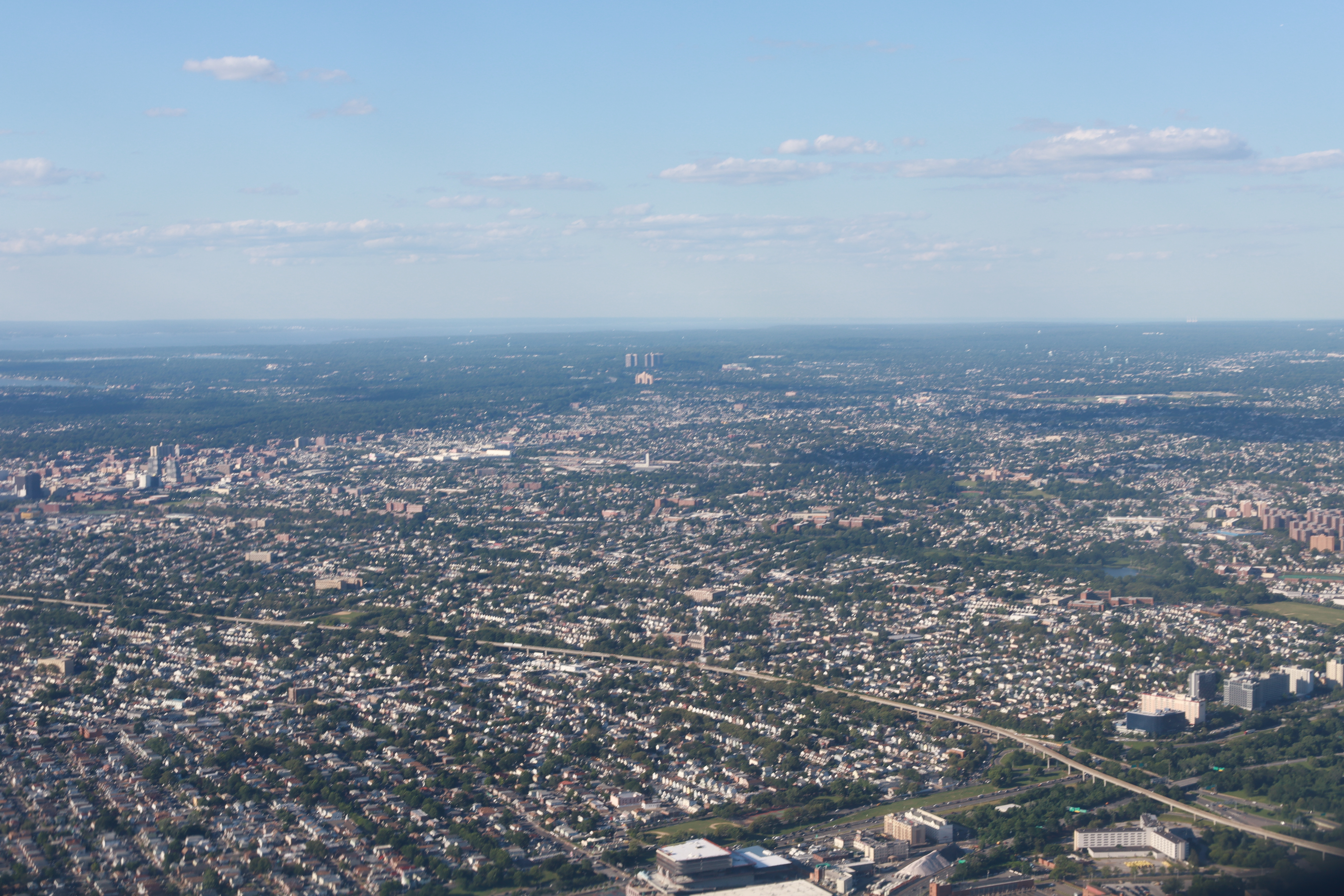
An aerial view of Queens looking north from John F. Kennedy International Airport

Queens is located on the far western portion of geographic Long Island and includes a few smaller islands, most of which are in Jamaica Bay, forming part of the Gateway National Recreation Area, which in turn is one of the National Parks of New York Harbor. According to the United States Census Bureau, Queens County has a total area of 178 square miles (460 km^{2}), of which 109 square miles (280 km^{2}) is land and 70 square miles (180 km^{2}) (39%) is water.

Brooklyn, the only other New York City borough on Long Island, lies just south and west of Queens. Newtown Creek, an estuary that flows into the East River, forms part of the border. To the west and north is the East River, across which is Manhattan to the west and The Bronx to the north. Nassau County is east of Queens on Long Island. Staten Island is southwest of Brooklyn, and shares only a three-mile-long water border (in the Outer Bay) with Queens.

North of Queens are Flushing Bay and the Flushing River, connecting to the East River. The East River opens into Long Island Sound. The midsection of Queens is crossed by the Long Island straddling terminal moraine created by the Wisconsin Glacier. The Rockaway Peninsula, the southernmost part of all of Queens, sits between Jamaica Bay and the Atlantic Ocean, featuring 7 miles (11 km) of beaches.

=== Climate ===
Under the Köppen climate classification, Queens has a humid subtropical climate (Cfa) transitoring the humid continental (Köppen climate classification Dfa); with partial shielding from the Appalachian Mountains and moderating influences from the Atlantic Ocean. Queens receives precipitation throughout the year, with an average of 44.8 in (1,140 mm) per year. In an average year, there will be 44 days with either moderate or heavy rain.

An average winter will have 22 days with some snowfall, of which nine days have at least 1 in (2.5 cm) of snowfall. Snowfall is 22 cm (8.6 in) in February (the highest). Summer is typically hot, humid, and wet. An average year will have 17 days with a high temperature of 90 °F (32 °C) or warmer. In an average year, there are 14 days on which the temperature does not go above 32 °F (0 °C) all day. Spring and autumn can vary from chilly to very warm.

The highest temperature ever recorded at LaGuardia Airport was 107 °F (42 °C) on July 3, 1966. The highest temperature ever recorded at John F. Kennedy International Airport was 104 °F (40 °C), also on July 3, 1966. LaGuardia Airport's record-low temperature was −7 °F (−22 °C) on February 15, 1943, the effect of which was exacerbated by a shortage of heating oil and coal. John F. Kennedy International Airport's record-low temperature was −2 °F (−19 °C), on February 8, 1963, and January 21, 1985. On January 24, 2016, 30.5 inches (77 cm) of snow fell, which is the record in Queens.

Tornadoes are generally rare. The most recent tornado, an EF0, touched down in College Point on August 3, 2018, causing minor damage. Before that, there was a tornado in Breezy Point on September 8, 2012, which damaged the roofs of some homes, and an EF1 tornado in Flushing on September 26, 2010.

Climate data for JFK Airport, New York (1991–2020 normals, (Note: Mean monthly maxima and minima (i.e. the expected highest and lowest temperature readings at any point during the year or given month) calculated based on data at said location from 1991 to 2020.) extremes 1948–present)
Month	Jan	Feb	Mar	Apr	May	Jun	Jul	Aug	Sep	Oct	Nov	Dec	Year
Record high °F (°C)	71 (22)	71 (22)	85 (29)	90 (32)	99 (37)	102 (39)	104 (40)	101 (38)	98 (37)	95 (35)	82 (28)	75 (24)	104 (40)
Mean maximum °F (°C)	57.7 (14.3)	58.3 (14.6)	67.5 (19.7)	77.9 (25.5)	85.6 (29.8)	92.4 (33.6)	95.2 (35.1)	91.9 (33.3)	87.9 (31.1)	79.7 (26.5)	68.9 (20.5)	60.6 (15.9)	96.8 (36.0)
Mean daily maximum °F (°C)	39.5 (4.2)	41.7 (5.4)	48.7 (9.3)	58.8 (14.9)	68.4 (20.2)	78.0 (25.6)	83.6 (28.7)	82.2 (27.9)	75.8 (24.3)	64.7 (18.2)	53.8 (12.1)	44.5 (6.9)	61.6 (16.4)
Daily mean °F (°C)	32.8 (0.4)	34.5 (1.4)	41.1 (5.1)	50.9 (10.5)	60.5 (15.8)	70.2 (21.2)	76.1 (24.5)	75.0 (23.9)	68.4 (20.2)	57.2 (14.0)	46.8 (8.2)	38.3 (3.5)	54.3 (12.4)
Mean daily minimum °F (°C)	26.2 (−3.2)	27.4 (−2.6)	33.6 (0.9)	42.9 (6.1)	52.5 (11.4)	62.4 (16.9)	68.7 (20.4)	67.8 (19.9)	61.0 (16.1)	49.8 (9.9)	39.8 (4.3)	32.0 (0.0)	47.0 (8.3)
Mean minimum °F (°C)	10.2 (−12.1)	13.3 (−10.4)	20.2 (−6.6)	32.6 (0.3)	42.9 (6.1)	52.6 (11.4)	62.8 (17.1)	60.1 (15.6)	50.0 (10.0)	37.9 (3.3)	26.9 (−2.8)	18.6 (−7.4)	8.2 (−13.2)
Record low °F (°C)	−2 (−19)	−2 (−19)	7 (−14)	20 (−7)	34 (1)	45 (7)	55 (13)	46 (8)	40 (4)	30 (−1)	15 (−9)	2 (−17)	−2 (−19)
Average precipitation inches (mm)	3.23 (82)	2.76 (70)	3.94 (100)	3.55 (90)	3.66 (93)	3.85 (98)	3.86 (98)	4.11 (104)	3.58 (91)	3.72 (94)	3.07 (78)	3.96 (101)	43.29 (1,100)
Average snowfall inches (cm)	7.5 (19)	8.6 (22)	4.3 (11)	0.6 (1.5)	0.0 (0.0)	0.0 (0.0)	0.0 (0.0)	0.0 (0.0)	0.0 (0.0)	0.0 (0.0)	0.4 (1.0)	4.5 (11)	25.9 (66)
Average precipitation days (≥ 0.01 inch)	10.7	9.8	10.8	11.4	11.8	10.6	9.4	9.0	8.2	9.4	8.9	11.2	121.2
Average snowy days (≥ 0.1 in)	4.6	3.8	2.5	0.3	0.0	0.0	0.0	0.0	0.0	0.0	0.2	2.6	14.0
Average relative humidity (%)	64.9	64.4	63.4	64.1	69.5	71.5	71.4	71.7	71.9	69.1	67.9	66.3	68.0
Source: NOAA (relative humidity 1961–1990)

Climate data for New York LaGuardia Airport, NY (1991-2020 normals, extremes 1939-present)
Month	Jan	Feb	Mar	Apr	May	Jun	Jul	Aug	Sep	Oct	Nov	Dec	Year
Record high °F (°C)	72 (22)	79 (26)	86 (30)	94 (34)	97 (36)	101 (38)	107 (42)	104 (40)	102 (39)	95 (35)	83 (28)	75 (24)	107 (42)
Mean maximum °F (°C)	60.2 (15.7)	60.0 (15.6)	69.3 (20.7)	81.7 (27.6)	89.3 (31.8)	94.1 (34.5)	97.4 (36.3)	94.7 (34.8)	89.6 (32.0)	81.2 (27.3)	70.9 (21.6)	62.8 (17.1)	98.7 (37.1)
Mean daily maximum °F (°C)	40.2 (4.6)	42.7 (5.9)	49.9 (9.9)	61.3 (16.3)	71.8 (22.1)	81.1 (27.3)	86.4 (30.2)	84.5 (29.2)	77.2 (25.1)	66.0 (18.9)	55.0 (12.8)	45.4 (7.4)	63.5 (17.5)
Daily mean °F (°C)	34.4 (1.3)	36.3 (2.4)	43.1 (6.2)	53.6 (12.0)	63.7 (17.6)	73.4 (23.0)	79.2 (26.2)	77.7 (25.4)	70.8 (21.6)	59.6 (15.3)	49.1 (9.5)	40.0 (4.4)	56.8 (13.8)
Mean daily minimum °F (°C)	28.6 (−1.9)	29.9 (−1.2)	36.2 (2.3)	46.0 (7.8)	55.7 (13.2)	65.7 (18.7)	71.9 (22.2)	71.0 (21.7)	64.4 (18.0)	53.3 (11.8)	43.2 (6.2)	34.7 (1.5)	50.1 (10.1)
Mean minimum °F (°C)	11.1 (−11.6)	13.6 (−10.2)	21.0 (−6.1)	34.2 (1.2)	45.6 (7.6)	54.3 (12.4)	63.5 (17.5)	62.4 (16.9)	52.9 (11.6)	40.7 (4.8)	29.4 (−1.4)	19.4 (−7.0)	8.7 (−12.9)
Record low °F (°C)	−3 (−19)	−7 (−22)	7 (−14)	22 (−6)	36 (2)	46 (8)	56 (13)	51 (11)	42 (6)	30 (−1)	17 (−8)	−2 (−19)	−7 (−22)
Average precipitation inches (mm)	3.25 (83)	2.93 (74)	4.01 (102)	3.85 (98)	3.58 (91)	4.03 (102)	4.30 (109)	4.41 (112)	3.88 (99)	3.81 (97)	3.15 (80)	4.08 (104)	45.28 (1,150)
Average snowfall inches (cm)	8.6 (22)	9.8 (25)	5.4 (14)	0.4 (1.0)	0.0 (0.0)	0.0 (0.0)	0.0 (0.0)	0.0 (0.0)	0.0 (0.0)	0.1 (0.25)	0.3 (0.76)	5.2 (13)	29.8 (76)
Average precipitation days (≥ 0.01 in)	10.3	10.2	10.9	11.2	11.6	10.7	9.7	9.5	8.3	9.0	8.8	11.5	121.7
Average snowy days (≥ 0.1 in)	4.4	3.7	2.6	0.2	0.0	0.0	0.0	0.0	0.0	0.0	0.2	2.7	13.8
Source: NOAA

== Neighborhoods ==
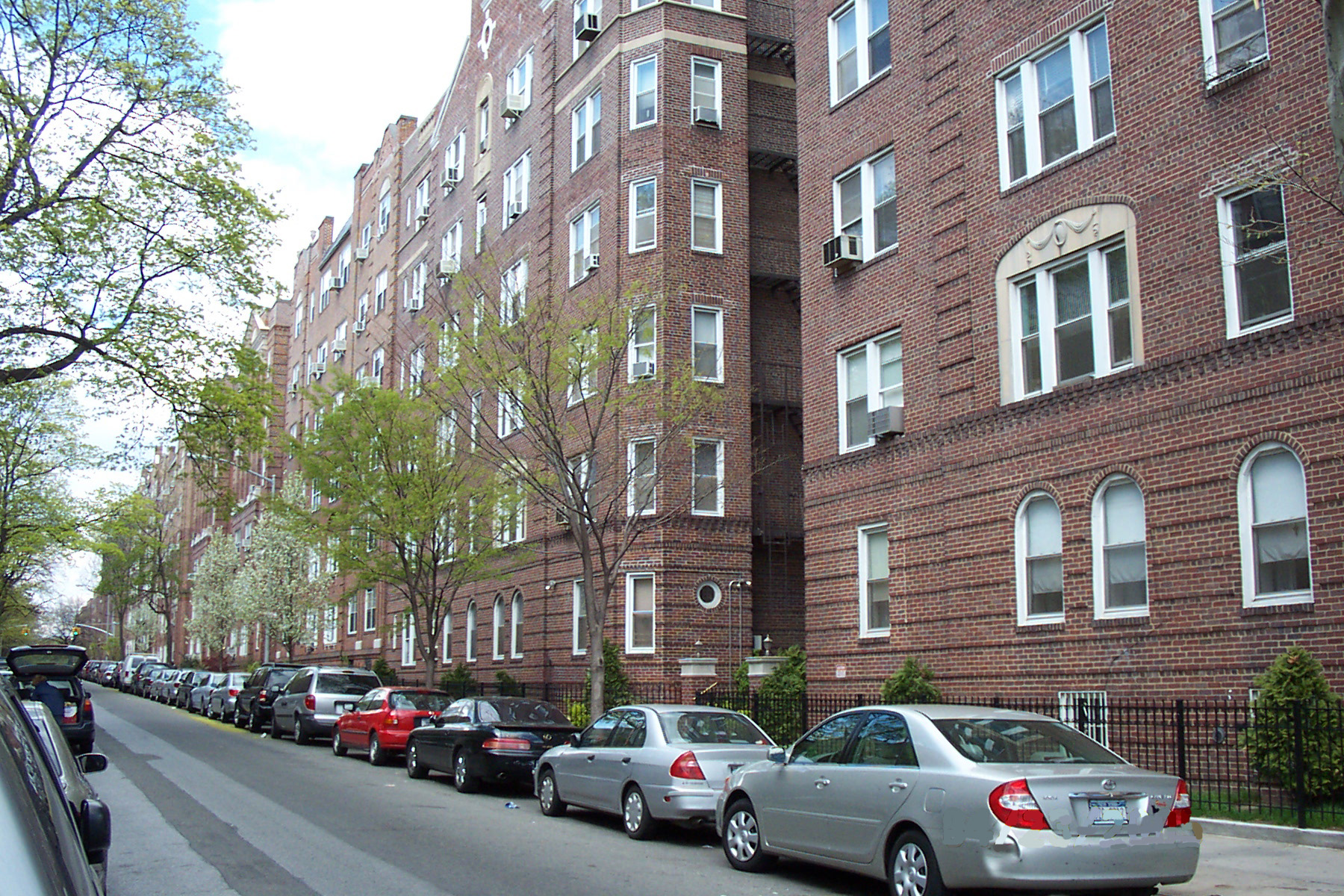
A residential street in Jackson Heights

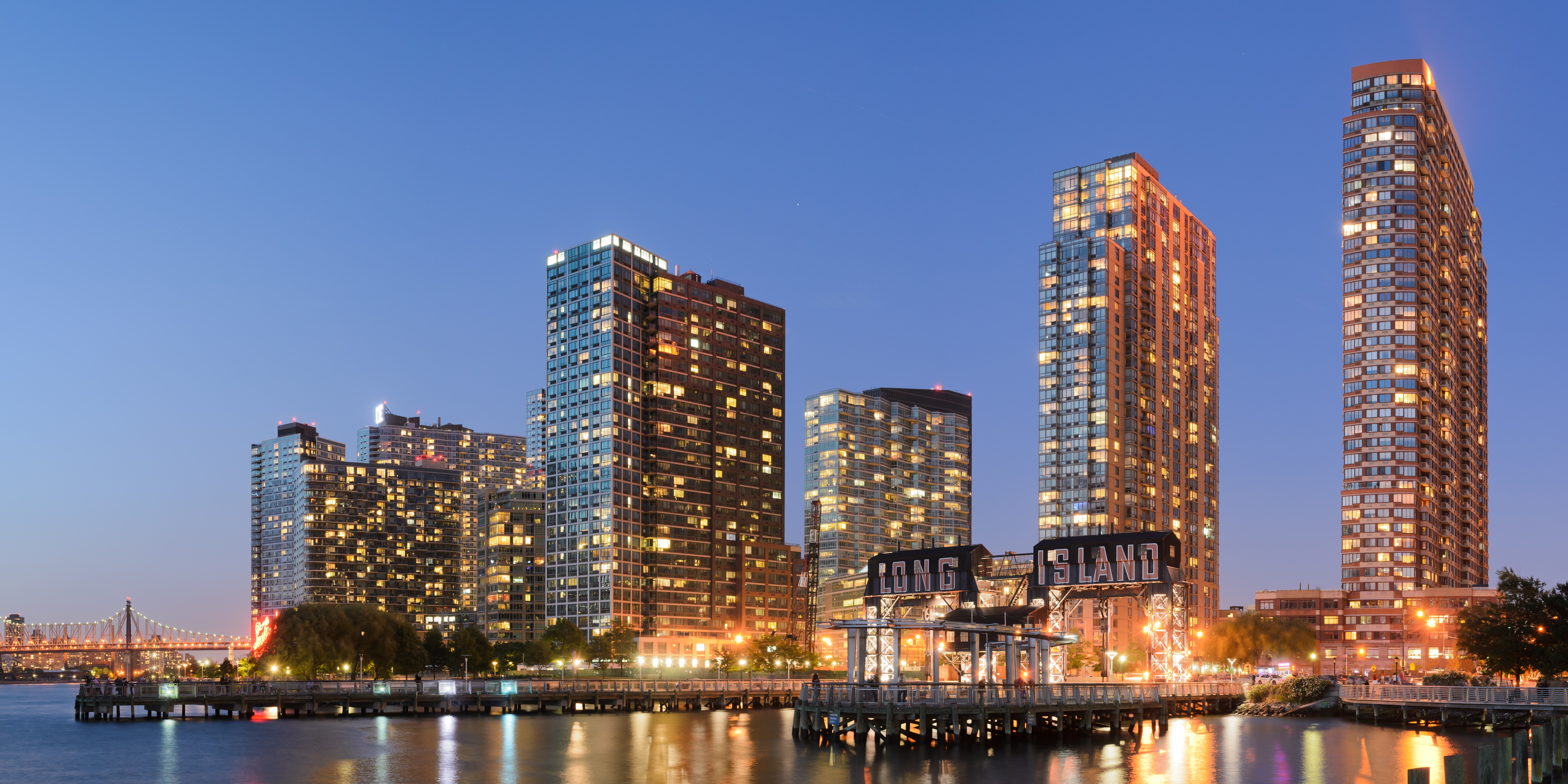
Long Island City, a neighborhood in western Queens

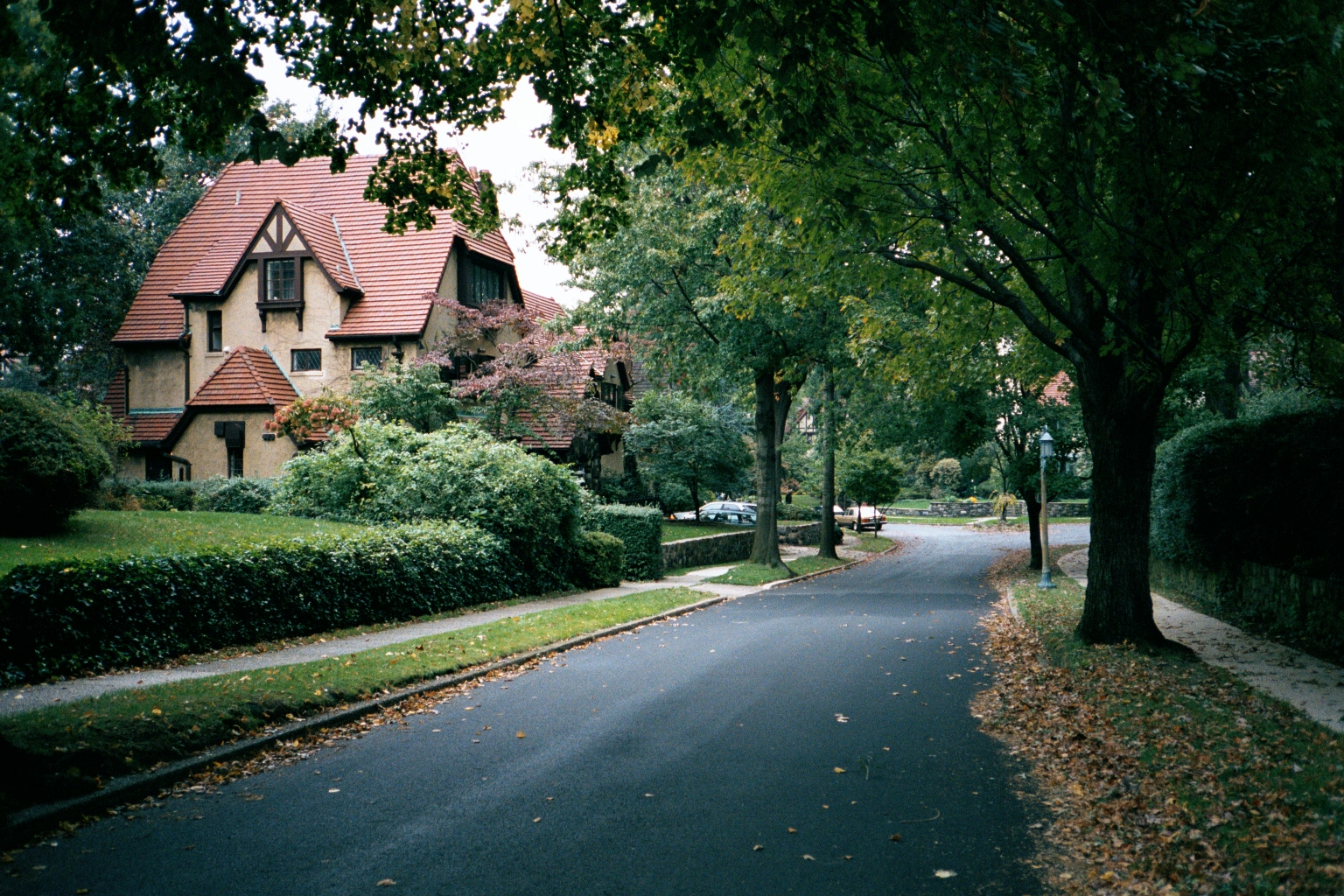
Forest Hills Gardens

Four United States Postal Service postal zones serve Queens, based roughly on those serving the towns in existence at the consolidation of the five boroughs into New York City: Long Island City (ZIP codes starting with 111), Jamaica (114), Flushing (113), and Far Rockaway (116). Also, the Floral Park post office (110), based in Nassau County, serves a small part of northeastern Queens.

Each of these main post offices has neighborhood stations with individual ZIP codes, and unlike the other boroughs, these station names are often used in addressing letters. These ZIP codes do not always reflect traditional neighborhood names and boundaries; "East Elmhurst", for example, was largely coined by the USPS and is not an official community. Most neighborhoods have no solid boundaries. The Forest Hills and Rego Park neighborhoods, for instance, overlap.

Residents of Queens often closely identify with their neighborhood rather than with the borough or city. The borough is a patchwork of dozens of unique neighborhoods, each with its own distinct identity:

1. Flushing, one of the largest neighborhoods in Queens, has a large and growing Asian community. The community consists of Chinese, Koreans, and South Asians. Asians have now expanded eastward along the Northern Boulevard axis through Murray Hill, Whitestone, Bayside, Douglaston–Little Neck, and eventually into adjacent Nassau County. These neighborhoods historically contained Italian Americans and Greeks, as well as Latino Americans. The busy intersection of Main Street, Kissena Boulevard, and 41st Avenue defines the center of Downtown Flushing and the Flushing Chinatown (法拉盛華埠), known as the "Chinese Times Square" or the "Chinese Manhattan". The segment of Main Street between Kissena Boulevard and Roosevelt Avenue, punctuated by the Long Island Rail Road trestle overpass, represents the cultural heart of the Flushing Chinatown. Housing over 25,000 individuals born in China alone, Flushing has become home to one of the largest Chinatowns, representing the largest Chinese population of any U.S. municipality other than New York City in total.
2. Howard Beach, Whitestone, and Middle Village are home to large Italian American populations. Howard Beach is also often considered the "Little Italy" of Queens.
3. Ozone Park and South Ozone Park have large Italian, Hispanic, and Guyanese populations.
4. Rockaway Beach has a large Irish American population.
5. Astoria, in the northwest, is traditionally home to one of the largest Greek populations outside Greece. It also has large Spanish American and Italian American communities, and is home to a sizable population of immigrants from the Middle East and the Balkans as well as young professionals from Manhattan. Nearby Long Island City is a major commercial center and the home to Queensbridge, the largest housing project in North America.
6. Maspeth and Ridgewood are home to many Eastern European immigrants such as German, Polish, Romanian, Serbian, Albanian, and other Slavic populations. Ridgewood also has a large Hispanic population.
7. Jackson Heights and Elmhurst make up a conglomeration of Hispanic, Asian, Tibetan, and South Asian communities. Jackson Heights is also known as "Little Colombia" and "Little India" thanks to the gastronomical and demographic impact of Colombian and South Asian people. It is also home to Middle Eastern (primarily Jewish), Greek, and Balkan communities.
8. Woodside is home to a large Filipino American community and has a "Little Manila" as well a large Irish American population. Many Filipino Americans live in Hollis and Queens Village.
9. Richmond Hill, in the south, is often thought of as "Little Guyana" for its large Guyanese community, as well as Punjab Avenue (ਪੰਜਾਬ ਐਵੇਨਿਊ), or Little Punjab, for its high concentration of Punjabi people.
10. Rego Park, Forest Hills, Kew Gardens, and Kew Gardens Hills have traditionally large Jewish populations (historically from Germany and Eastern Europe; though more recent immigrants are from Israel, Iran, and the former Soviet Union). These neighborhoods are also known for large and growing Asian communities, mainly immigrants from China.
11. Jamaica Estates, Jamaica Hills, Hillcrest, Fresh Meadows, and Hollis Hills are also populated with many people of Jewish background. Many Asian families reside in parts of Fresh Meadows as well.
12. Jamaica is home to large African American, Caribbean, and Central American populations. There are also middle-class African American and Caribbean neighborhoods such as Saint Albans, Queens Village, Cambria Heights, Springfield Gardens, Rosedale, Laurelton, and Briarwood along east and southeast Queens.
13. Bellerose and Floral Park, originally home to many Irish Americans, is home to a growing South Asian population, predominantly Indian Americans.
14. Corona and Corona Heights was a predominantly Italian community with a strong African American community in the northern portion of Corona and adjacent East Elmhurst. From the 1920s through the 1960s, Corona remained a close-knit neighborhood. Corona today has the highest concentration of Latinos of any Queens neighborhood, with a relatively sizable Chinese American population, located between Elmhurst and Flushing.

== Demographics ==
New York City's five boroughs
Jurisdiction		Population	Land area		Density of population		GDP
Borough	County	Census (2020)	square miles	square km	people/ sq. mile	people/ sq. km	billions (US$, 2024) ^{2}
The Bronx	Bronx	1,472,654	42.2	109.2	34,920	13,482	58.323
Brooklyn	Kings	2,736,074	69.4	179.7	39,438	15,227	145.934
Manhattan	New York	1,694,251	22.7	58.7	74,781	28,872	1,006.673
Queens	Queens	2,405,464	108.7	281.6	22,125	8,542	143.131
Staten Island	Richmond	495,747	57.5	149.0	8,618	3,327	23.779
City of New York		8,804,190	300.5	778.2	29,303	11,314	1,354.061
State of New York		20,201,249	47,123.6	122,049.5	429	166	2,297.028
Sources: and see individual borough articles.

Racial composition	2020	2010	1990	1970	1950
White	25.8%	39.7%	57.9%	85.3%	96.5%
—Non-Hispanic	22.8%	27.6%	48.0%	n/a	n/a
Black or African American	16.8%	19.1%	21.7%	13.0%	3.3%
Hispanic or Latino (of any race)	27.8%	27.5%	19.5%	7.7%	n/a
Asian	27.5%	22.9%	12.2%	1.1%	0.1%

Historical population
Census	Pop.	Note	%±
1790	16,014		—
1800	16,916		5.6%
1810	19,336		14.3%
1820	21,519		11.3%
1830	22,460		4.4%
1840	30,324		35.0%
1850	36,833		21.5%
1860	57,391		55.8%
1870	73,803		28.6%
1880	90,574		22.7%
1890	128,059		41.4%
1900	152,999		19.5%
1910	284,041		85.6%
1920	469,042		65.1%
1930	1,079,129		130.1%
1940	1,297,634		20.2%
1950	1,550,849		19.5%
1960	1,809,578		16.7%
1970	1,986,473		9.8%
1980	1,891,325		−4.8%
1990	1,951,598		3.2%
2000	2,229,379		14.2%
2010	2,230,722		0.1%
2020	2,405,464		7.8%
2025 (est.)	2,358,182	▼	−2.0%
U.S. Decennial Census; 1790-19601900-1990; 1990-2000 2010 2020

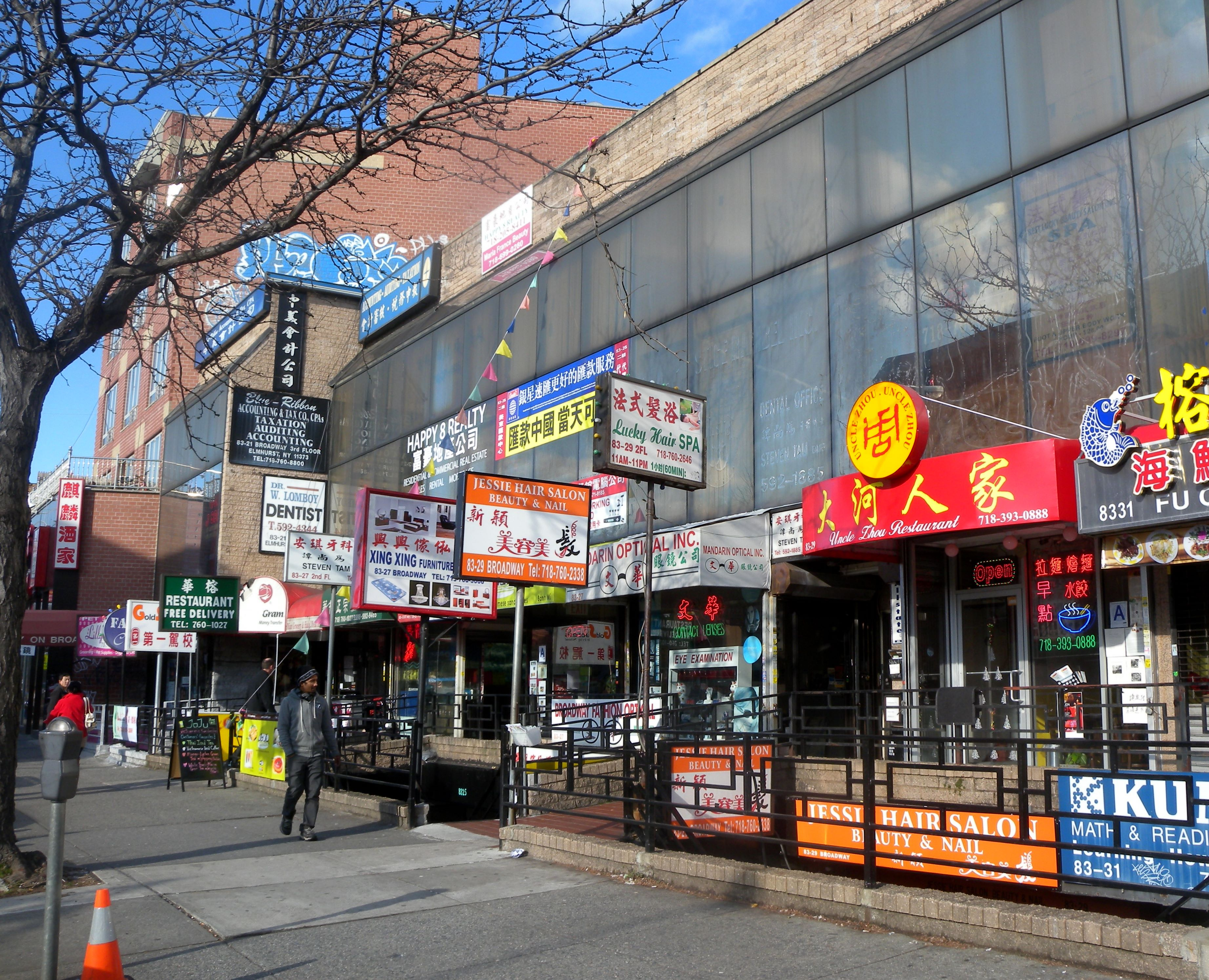
The Elmhurst Chinatown (艾姆赫斯特 唐人街) at the corner of Broadway and Dongan Avenue

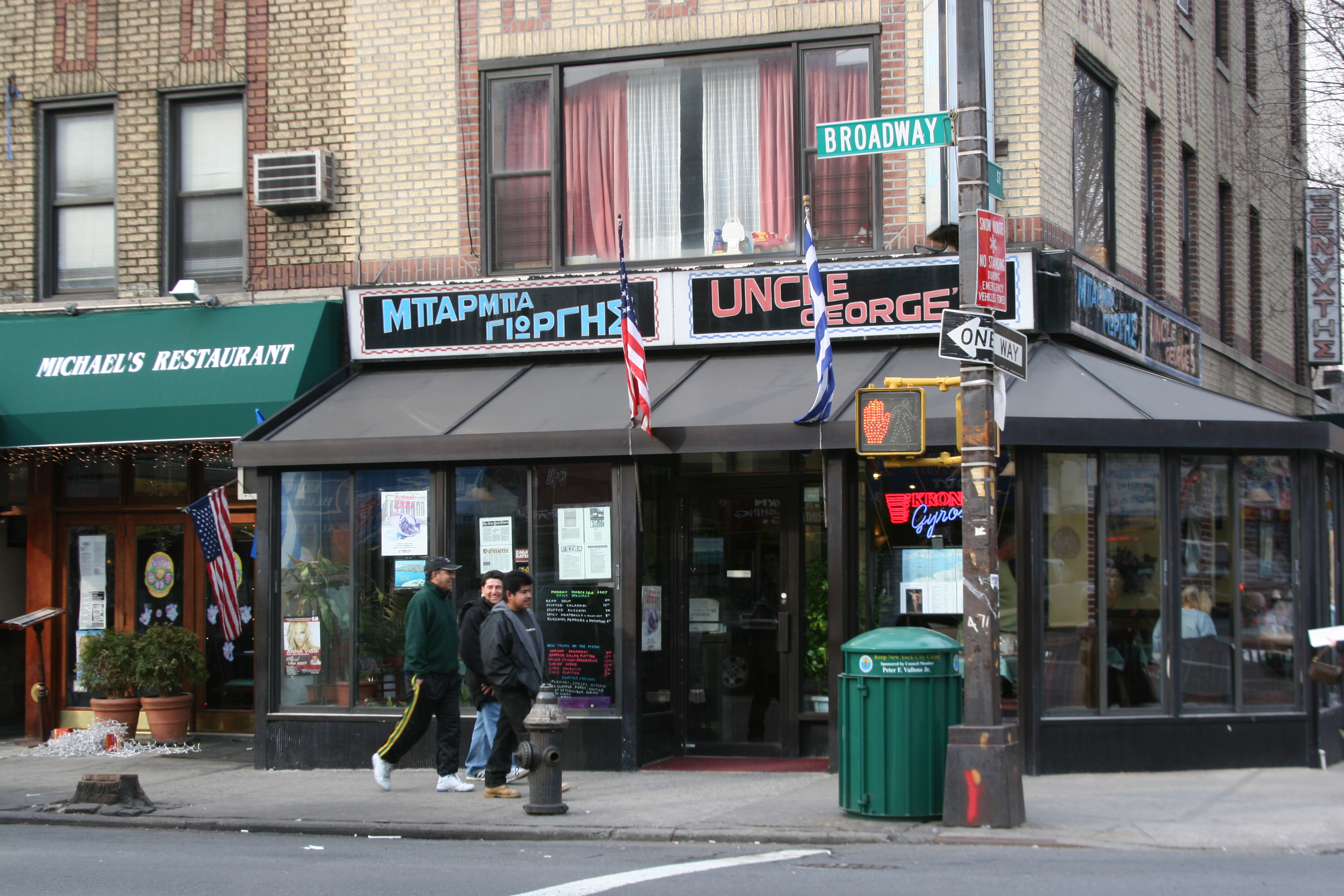
Astoria, a largely Greek-American neighborhood

At the 2020 census, 2,405,464 people lived in Queens. There was an owner-occupancy rate of 44.5%. In the 2010 United States census, Queens recorded a population of 2,230,722. There were 780,117 households enumerated, with an average of 2.82 persons per household. The population density was 20,465.3 inhabitants per square mile (7,901.7 inhabitants/km^{2}). There were 835,127 housing units at an average density of 7,661.7 units per square mile (2,958.2/km^{2}).

In 2010, the racial makeup of Queens was 39.7% White, 19.1% Black or African American, 0.7% Native American, 22.9% Asian, 0.1% Pacific Islander, 12.9% from other races, and 4.5% from two or more races. A total of 27.5% of the population were Hispanic or Latin American of any race. The non-Hispanic white population was 27.6%. In 2019, non-Hispanic whites made up an estimated 24.4% of the population, and Black or African Americans residents were 17.3%. The largest minority groups for the borough were Hispanic or Latino Americans (28.2%), and Asians (26.0%).

In Queens, the age distribution consisted of 6.2% of the population under five years of age, 13.9% between the ages of six and 18, 64.2% between 19 and 64, and 15.7% over the age of 65. Females made up 51.5% of the population. An estimated 47.5% of residents were foreign-born in 2018. The per capita income was $28,814, and the median household income was $62,008. In 2018, 12.2% of residents lived below the poverty line.

The New York City Department of City Planning was alarmed by the negligible reported increase in population between 2000 and 2010. Areas with high proportions of immigrants and undocumented aliens are traditionally undercounted for a variety of reasons, often based on a mistrust of government officials or an unwillingness to be identified. In many cases, counts of vacant apartment units did not match data from local surveys and reports from property owners.

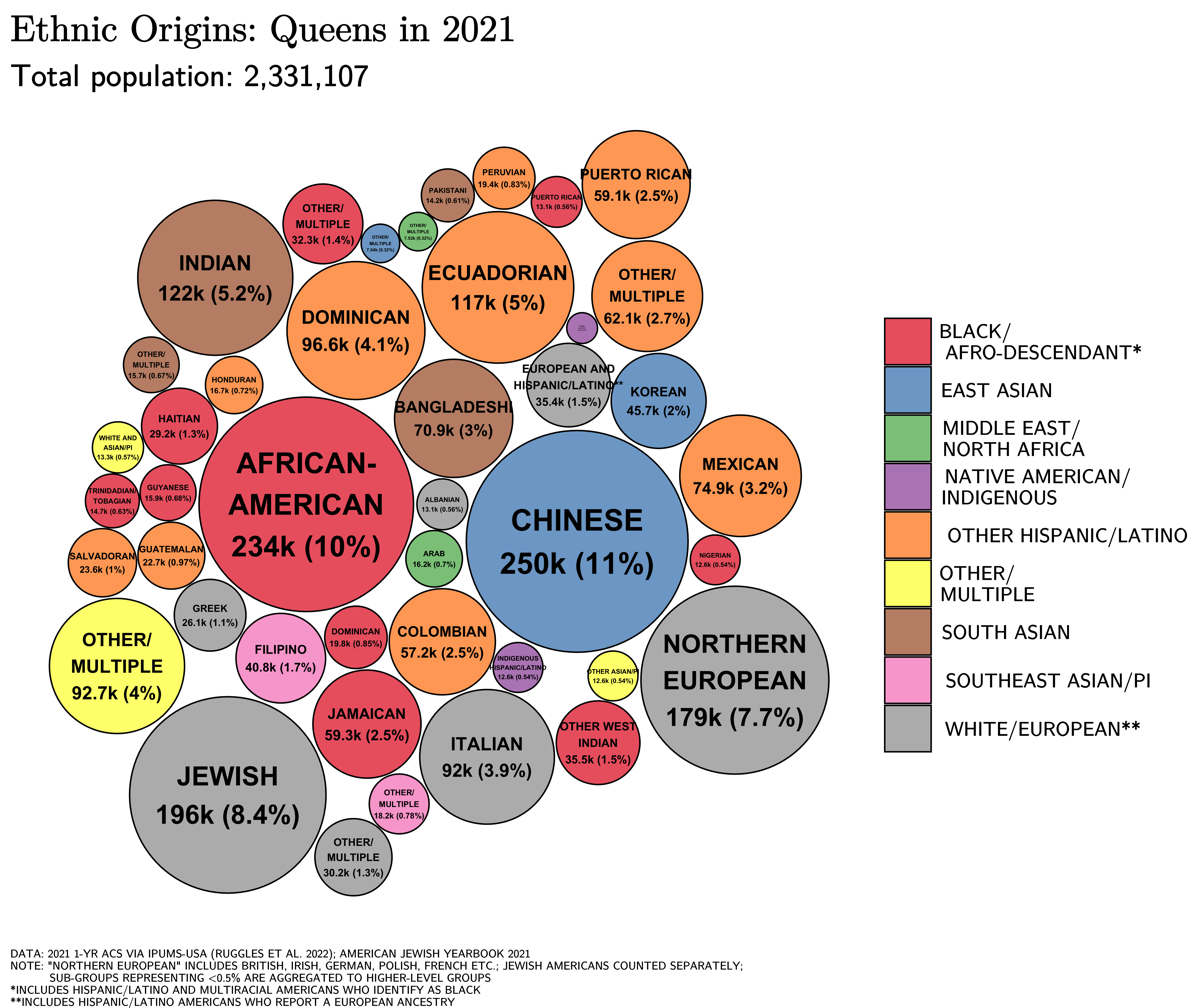
Ethnic origins in Queens

As of 2023, illegal Chinese immigration to New York City, especially to Queens and its Flushing Chinatown, had accelerated.

=== Ethnic groups ===
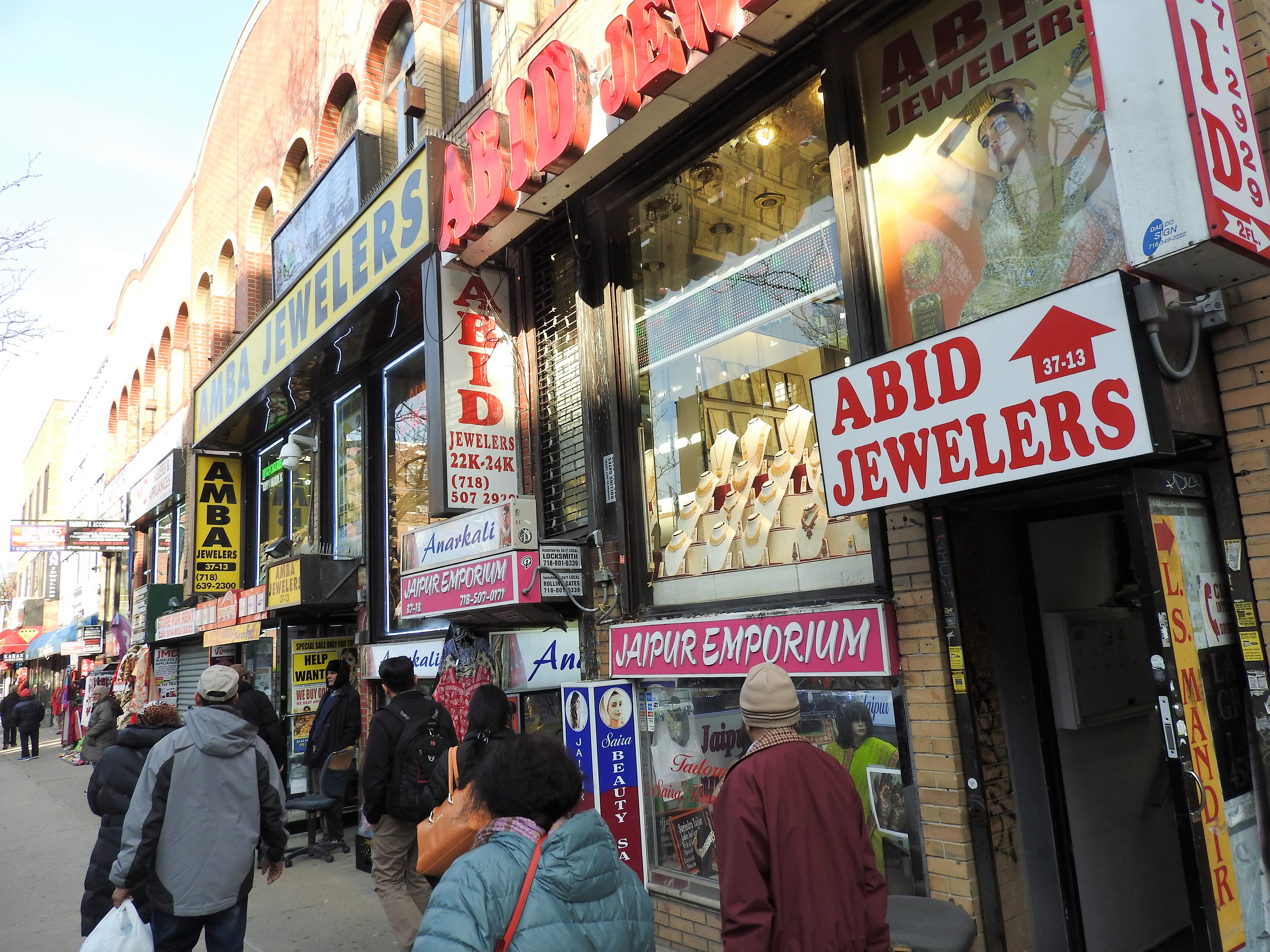
Little India in Jackson Heights

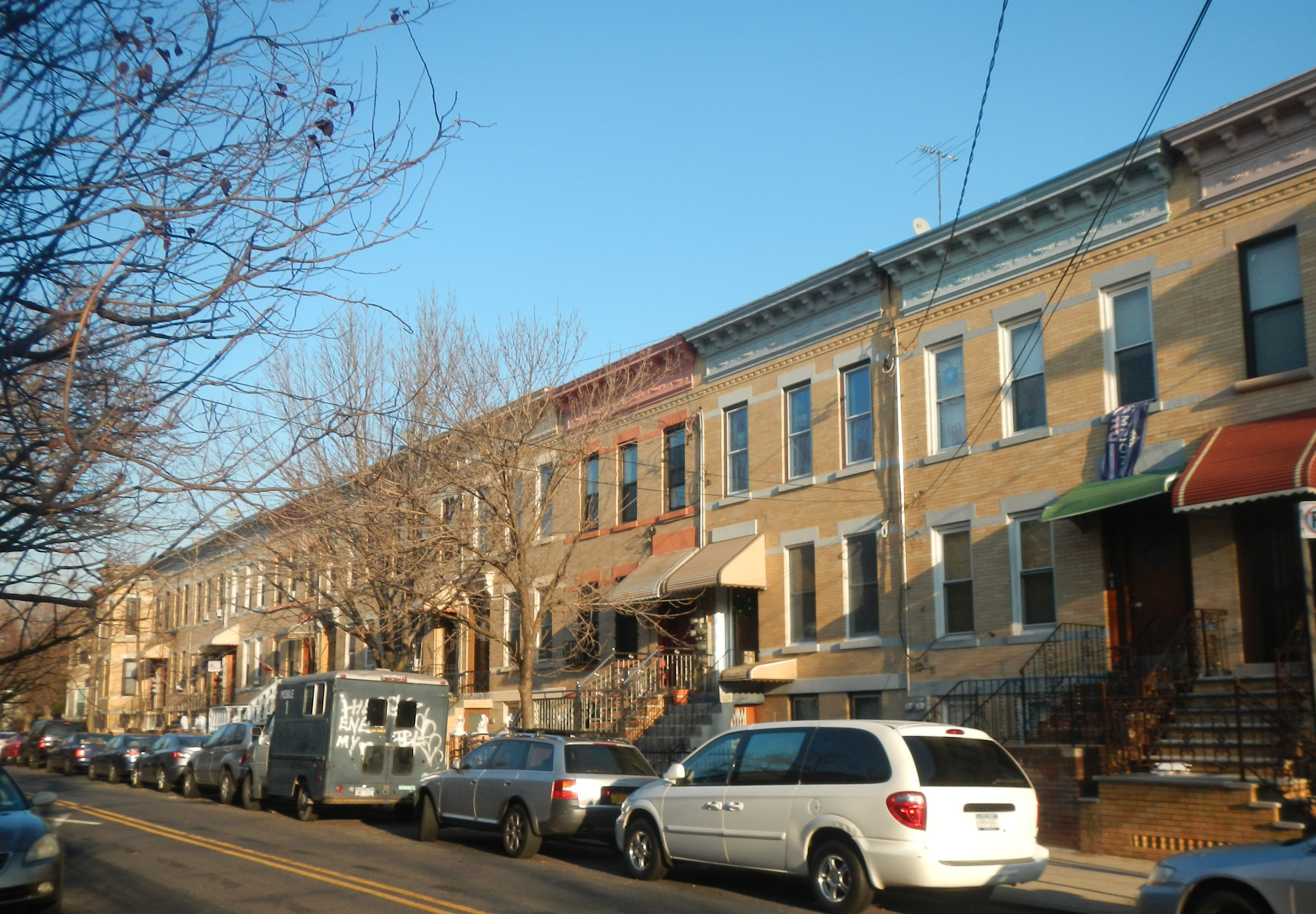
Ridgewood is home to a large Puerto Rican community

According to a 2001 Claritas study, Queens was the most diverse county in the United States among counties of 100,000+ population. A 2014 analysis by The Atlantic found Queens County to be the third most racially diverse county-equivalent in the United States—behind Aleutians West Census Area and Aleutians East Borough in Alaska—as well as the most diverse county in New York. Meanwhile, a 2017 study by Axios found that, although numerous smaller counties in the United States had higher rates of diversity, Queens was the United States' most diverse populous county.

In Queens, approximately 48.5% of the population was foreign born as of 2010. Within the foreign born population, 49.5% were born in Latin America, 33.5% in Asia, 14.8% in Europe, 1.8% in Africa, and 0.4% in North America. Roughly 2.1% of the population was born in Puerto Rico, a U.S. territory, or abroad to American parents. In addition, 51.2% of the population was born in the United States. Approximately 44.2% of the population over 5 years of age speak English at home; 23.8% speak Spanish at home. Also, 16.8% of the populace speak other Indo-European languages at home. Another 13.5% speak a non-Indo-European Asian language or language of the Pacific Islands at home. Among the Asian population in 2010, people of Chinese ethnicity made up the largest ethnic group at 10.2% of Queens' population, with about 237,484 people; the other East and Southeast Asian groups are: Koreans (2.9%), Filipinos (1.7%), Japanese (0.3%), Thais (0.2%), Vietnamese (0.2%), and Indonesians and Burmese both make up 0.1% of the population. People of South Asian descent made up 7.8% of Queens' population: Indians (5.3%), Bangladeshi (1.5%), Pakistanis (0.7%), and Nepali (0.2%). In 2019, Chinese Americans remained the largest Asian ethnicity (10.9%) followed by Asian Indians (5.7%). Asian Indians had estimated population of 144,896 in 2014 (6.24% of the 2014 borough population), as well as Pakistani Americans, who numbered at 15,604. Queens has the second largest Sikh population in the nation after California.

Among the Asian population in 2010, people of Chinese ethnicity made up the largest ethnic group at 10.2% of Queens' population, with about 237,484 people; the other East and Southeast Asian groups are: Koreans (2.9%), Filipinos (1.7%), Japanese (0.3%), Thais (0.2%), Vietnamese (0.2%), and Indonesians and Burmese both make up 0.1% of the population. People of South Asian descent made up 7.8% of Queens' population: Indians (5.3%), Bangladeshi (1.5%), Pakistanis (0.7%), and Nepali (0.2%). In 2019, Chinese Americans remained the largest Asian ethnicity (10.9%) followed by Asian Indians (5.7%). Asian Indians had estimated population of 144,896 in 2014 (6.24% of the 2014 borough population), as well as Pakistani Americans, who numbered at 15,604. Queens has the second largest Sikh population in the nation after California.

Among the Hispanic or Latin American population, Puerto Ricans made up the largest ethnic group at 4.6%, next to Mexicans, who made up 4.2% of the population, and Dominicans at 3.9%. Central Americans made up 2.4% and are mostly Salvadorans. South Americans constitute 9.6% of Queens's population, mainly of Ecuadorian (4.4%) and Colombian descent (4.2%). The 2019 American Community Survey estimated Mexicans and Puerto Ricans were equally the largest groups (4.5% each) in Queens, and Cuban Americans were the third largest single group. Other Hispanic and Latinos collectively made up 18.9% of the population. The Hispanic or Latino population increased by 61% to 597,773 between 1990 and 2006 and now accounts for over 26.5% of the borough's population.

Queens has the largest Colombian population in the city, accounting for over 35.6% of the city's total Colombian population, for a total of 145,956 in 2019; it also has the largest Ecuadorian population in the city, accounting for 62.2% of the city's total Ecuadorian population, for a total of 101,339. Queens has the largest Peruvian population in the city, accounting for 69.9% of the city's total Peruvian population, for a total of 30,825. Queens has the largest Salvadoran population in the city, accounting for 50.7% of the city for a total population of 25,235. The Mexican population in Queens has increased 45.7% since 2011 to 71,283, the second-highest in the city, after Brooklyn.

Queens is also home to 49.6% of the city's Asian population. Among the five boroughs, Queens has the largest population of Chinese, Indian, Korean, Filipino, Bangladeshi and Pakistani Americans. Queens has the largest Asian American population by county outside the Western United States; according to the 2006 American Community Survey, Queens ranks fifth among US counties with 477,772 (21.18%) Asian Americans, behind Los Angeles County, California, Honolulu County, Hawaii, Santa Clara County, California, and Orange County, California.

Some main European ancestries in Queens as of 2000 include: Italian (8.4%), Irish (5.5%), German (3.5%), Polish (2.7%), Russian (2.3%), and Greek (2.0%). Of the European American population, Queens has the third largest Bosnian population in the United States behind only St. Louis and Chicago, numbering more than 15,000. Queens is home to some 50,000 Armenian Americans.

The Jewish Community Study of New York 2011, sponsored by the UJA-Federation of New York, found that about 9% of Queens residents were Jews. In 2011, there were about 198,000 Jews in Queens, making it home to about 13% of all people in Jewish households in the eight-county area consisting of the Five Boroughs and Westchester, Nassau, and Suffolk counties. Russian-speaking Jews make up 28% of the Jewish population in Queens, the largest in any of the eight counties.

In Queens, the Black and African American population earns more than non-Hispanic whites on average. Many of these Blacks and African Americans live in quiet, middle-class suburban neighborhoods near the Nassau County border, such as Laurelton and Cambria Heights, which have large Black populations whose family income is higher than average. The migration of European Americans from parts of Queens has been long ongoing with departures from Ozone Park, Woodhaven, Bellerose, Floral Park, and Flushing (most of the outgoing population has been replaced with Asian Americans). Neighborhoods such as Whitestone, College Point, North Flushing, Auburndale, Bayside, Middle Village, and Douglaston–Little Neck have not had a substantial exodus of white residents, but have seen an increase of Asian population, mostly Chinese and Korean. Queens has experienced a real estate boom making most of its neighborhoods desirable for people who want to reside near Manhattan but in a less urban setting.

=== Languages ===
According to the office of the New York State Comptroller in 2000, 138 languages are spoken in the borough. The 2021 American Community Survey by the United States Census Bureau, found that – of those over the age of five residing in Queens – 54.53% spoke a language other than English in the home. The following tables shows the 15 most common non-English languages in Queens, with the most prominent being Spanish, Chinese, and Bengali.

Language
Ages 5+
%
Source →

1		2	3	4	5	6	7	8	9	10	11	12	13	14	15	16
English	non-English	Spanish	Chinese	Bengali	Korean	Tagalog	Russian	Haitian Creole	Polish	Italian	Greek	Arabic	Punjabi	Urdu	Hindi	French
1,000,116	1,199,561	516,251	205,371	84,349	41,420	30,427	28,013	24,928	22,342	21,273	19,749	16,269	16,139	15,769	13,176	12,384
45.47%	54.53%	23.47%	9.34%	3.83%	1.88%	1.38%	1.27%	1.13%	1.02%	0.97%	0.9%	0.74%	0.73%	0.72%	0.6%	0.56%
"2021 American Community Survey: LANGUAGE SPOKEN AT HOME"". United States Census Bureau. 2010. Archived from the original on July 23, 2023.

=== Religion ===
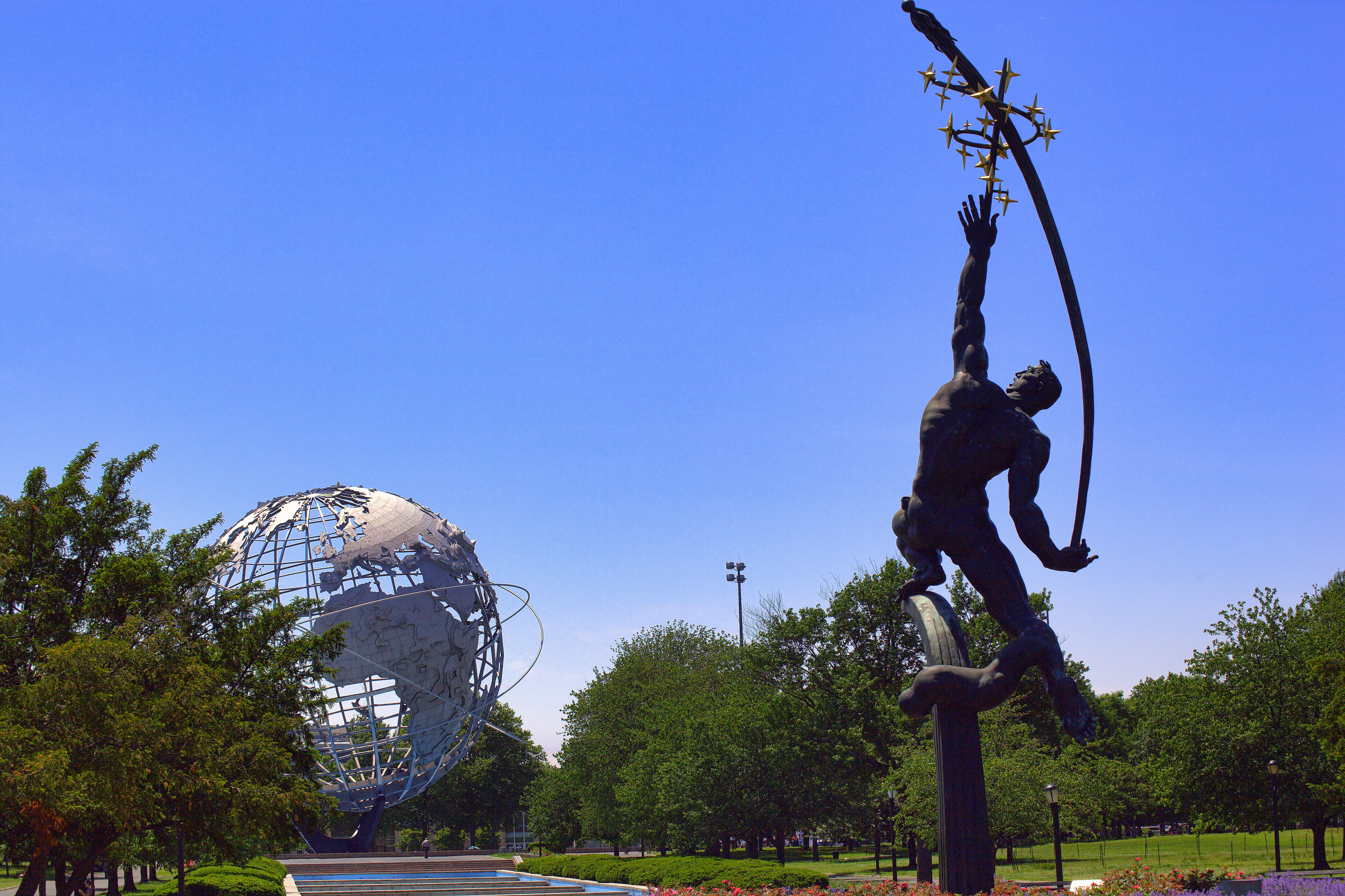
Rocket Thrower (1963) at Flushing Meadows–Corona Park

In 2010, the largest religious group in Queens was the Diocese of Brooklyn, with 677,520 Roman Catholics worshiping at 100 parishes. There were 81,456 Muslims with 57 congregations, 80,000 Orthodox Jews with 110 congregations, 33,325 non-denominational Christian adherents with 129 congregations, 28,085 AME Methodists with 14 congregations, 24,250 Greek Orthodox with 6 congregations.

There were 16,775 Hindus with 18 congregations, 13,989 AoG Pentecostals with 64 congregations, 13,507 Seventh-day Adventists with 45 congregations, and 12,957 Mahayana Buddhists with 26 congregations. 49.4% of the population self identified as members of religious congregations. Members of historically African American denominations were underrepresented due to incomplete information. In 2014, Queens had 738 religious organizations, the thirteenth most out of all U.S. counties.

== Culture ==
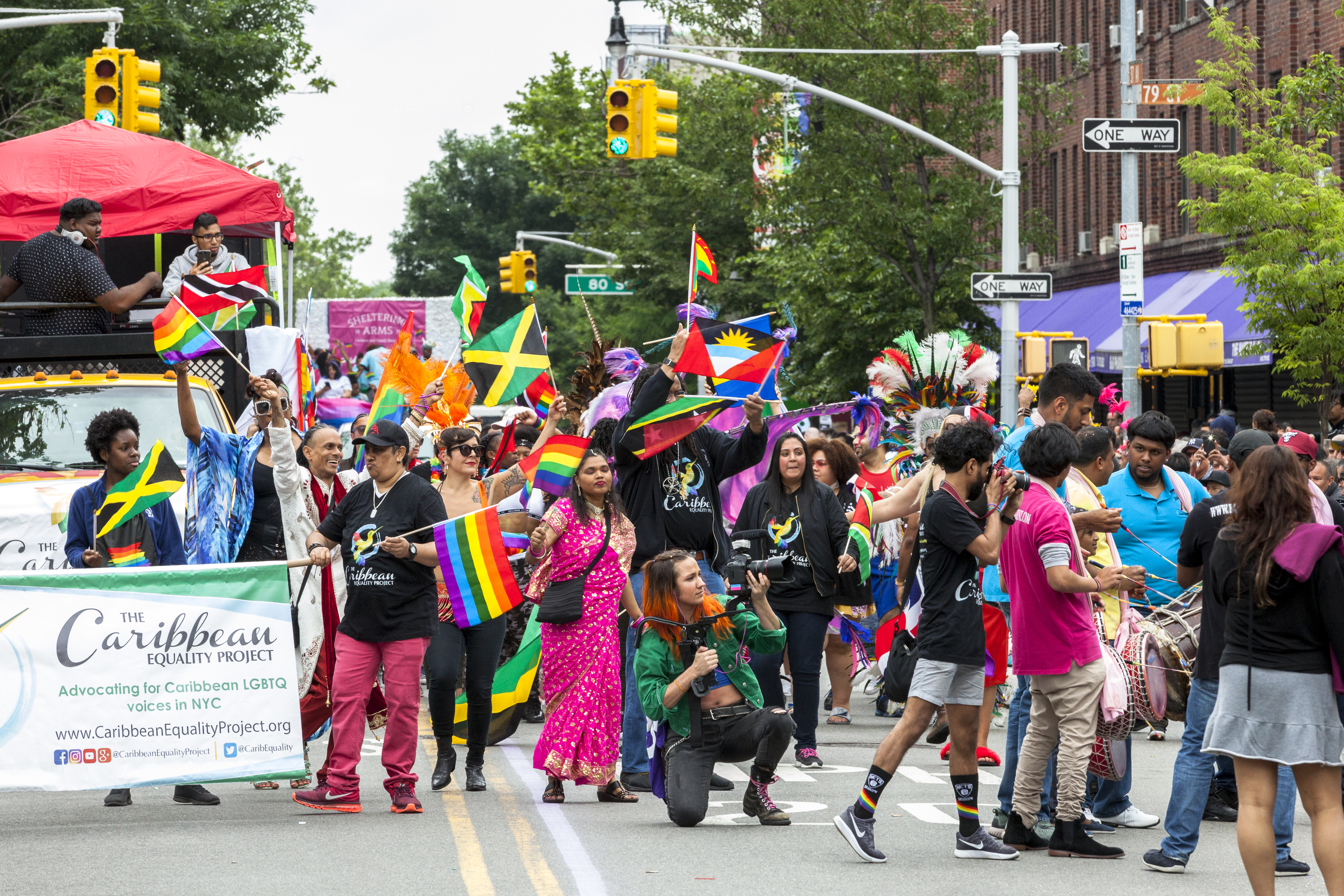

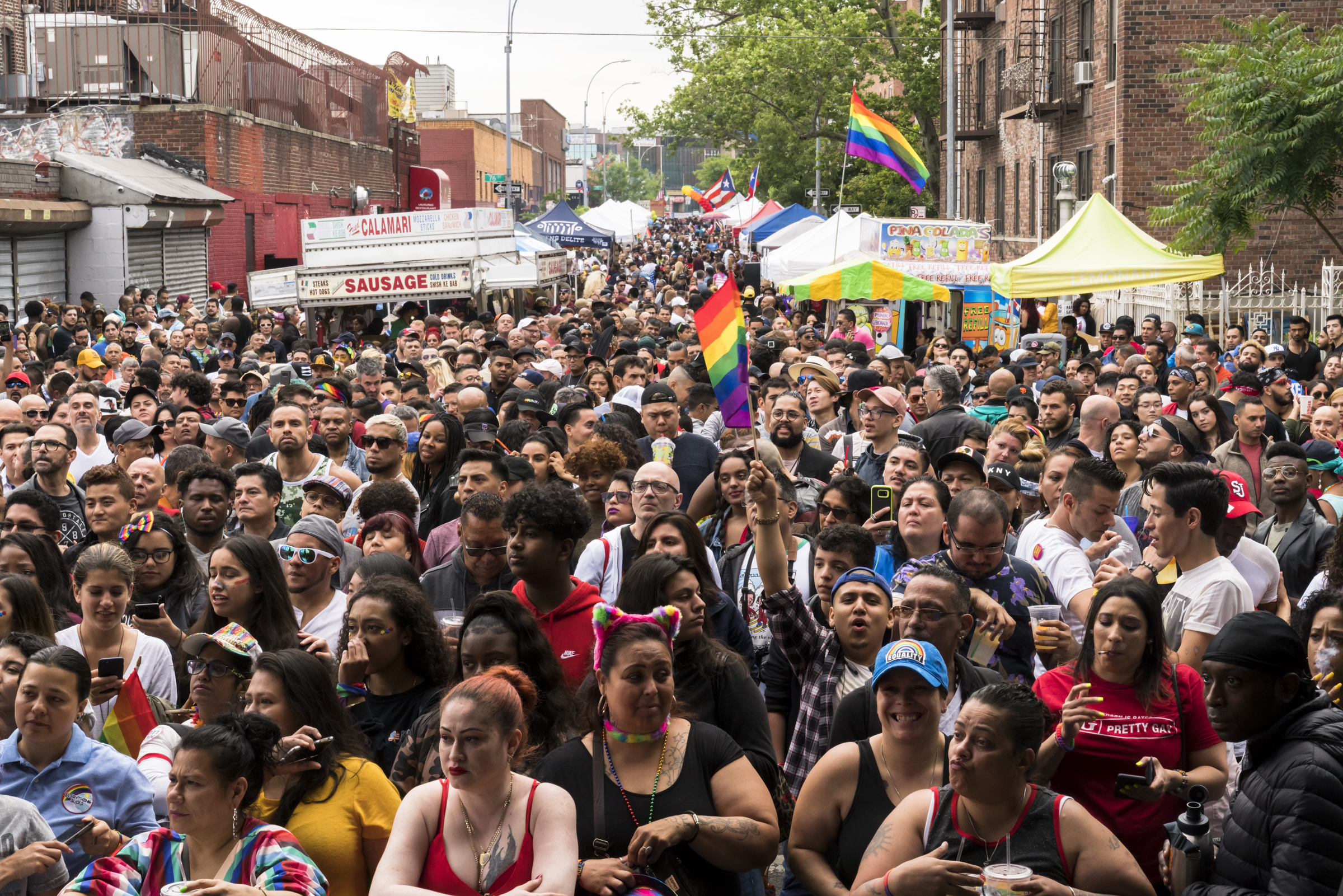
The 2018 Queens Pride Parade: Caribbean Equality Project at top, and the ensuing multicultural festival below

Queens has been the center of the punk rock movement, particularly in New York; Ramones originated out of Forest Hills, it has also been the home of such notable artists as Tony Bennett, Francis Ford Coppola, Paul Simon, and Robert Mapplethorpe.

Queens Poet Laureates (generally, 3-year appointments):

- 1997–2001: Stephen Stepanchev (inaugural Poet Laureate)
- 2001–2004: Hal Sirowitz (born 1949)
- 2004–2007: Ishle Yi Park
- 2007–2010: Julio Marzan
- 2010–2014: Paolo Javier
- 2015–2019: Maria Lisella

Queens has notably fostered African American culture, with establishments such as The Afrikan Poetry Theatre and the Black Spectrum Theater Company catering specifically to African Americans in Queens. In the 1940s, Queens was an important center of jazz; such jazz luminaries as Louis Armstrong, Charlie Parker, and Ella Fitzgerald took up residence in Queens, seeking refuge from the segregation they found elsewhere in New York. Many notable hip-hop acts hail from Queens, including Nas, Run-D.M.C., Kool G Rap, A Tribe Called Quest, LL Cool J, MC Shan, Mobb Deep, 50 Cent, Nicki Minaj, Tony Yayo, Tragedy Khadafi, N.O.R.E., Lloyd Banks, Capone, Ja Rule, Heems of Das Racist and Action Bronson.

Queens hosts various museums and cultural institutions that serve its diverse communities. They range from the historical (such as the John Bowne House) to the scientific (such as the New York Hall of Science), from conventional art galleries (such as the Noguchi Museum) to unique graffiti exhibits (such as 5 Pointz). Queens's cultural institutions include, but are not limited to:

- 5 Pointz
- Afrikan Poetry Theatre
- Bowne House
- Flushing Town Hall
- King Manor
- MoMA PS1
- Museum of the Moving Image
- Noguchi Museum
- New York Hall of Science
- Queens Botanical Garden
- Queens Museum of Art
- SculptureCenter
- Hindu Temple Society of North America
- Jamaica Center for Arts and Learning

The travel magazine Lonely Planet also named Queens the top destination in the country for 2015 for its cultural and culinary diversity. Stating that Queens is "quickly becoming its hippest" but that "most travelers haven't clued in... yet," the Lonely Planet stated that "nowhere is the image of New York as the global melting pot truer than Queens."

=== Food ===
The cuisine available in Queens reflects its vast cultural diversity. The cuisine of a particular neighborhood often represents its demographics; for example, Astoria hosts many Greek restaurants, in keeping with its traditionally Greek population. Jackson Heights is known for its prominent Indian cuisine and also many Latin American eateries.

The Queens Night Market in Flushing Meadows–Corona Park, operating since 2015 on Saturdays from April to October (with a break from late August to mid-September), offers samples of food capped at $6 from dozens of countries with attendance of up to 20,000 a night.

== Economy ==
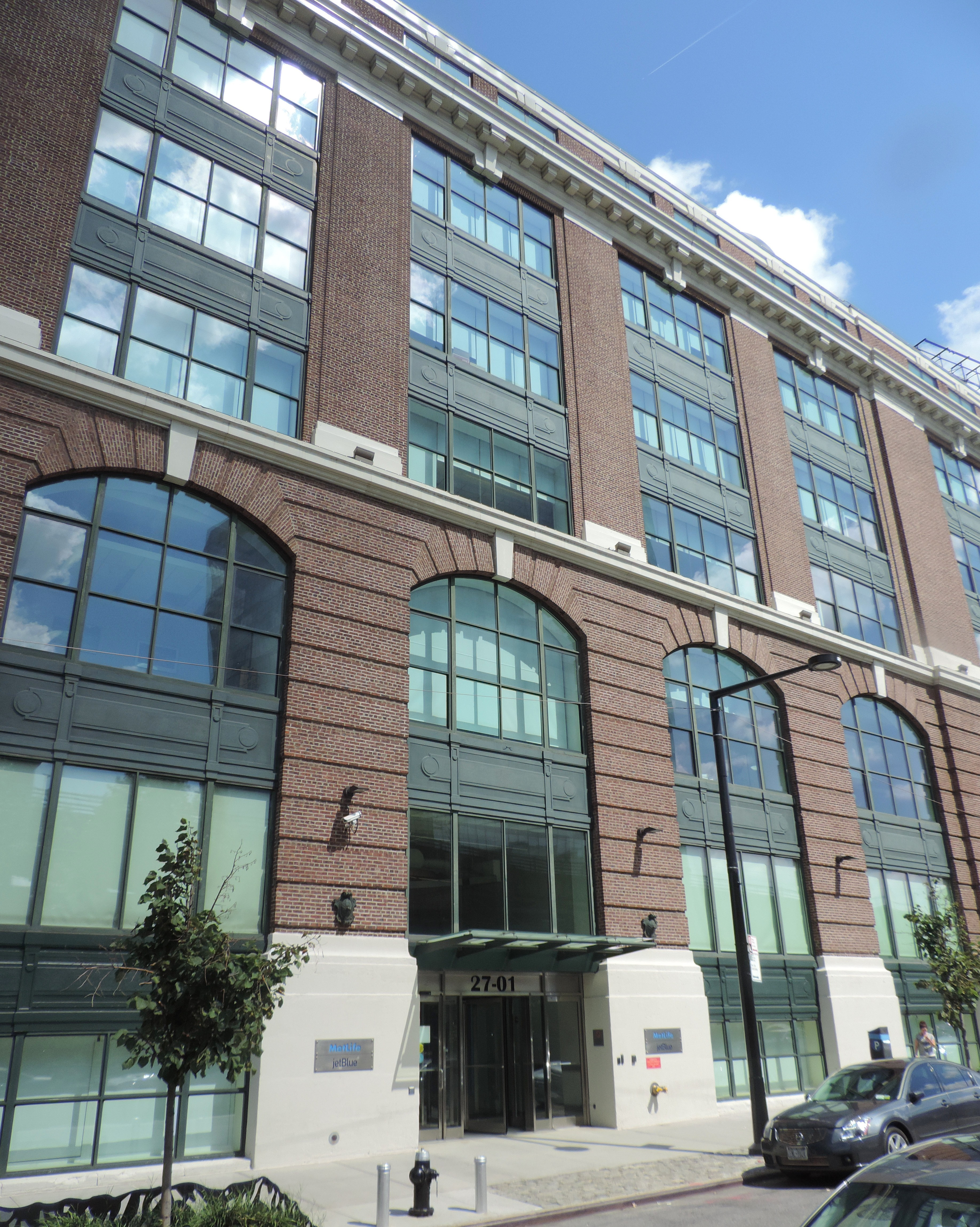
JetBlue's corporate headquarters in Queens

Queens has the second-largest economy of New York City's five boroughs, following Manhattan. In 2004, Queens had 15.2% (440,310) of all private-sector jobs in New York City and 8.8% of private-sector wages. In 2012, private-sector employment increased to 486,160. Queens has the most diversified economy of the five boroughs, with occupations spread relatively evenly across the health care, retail trade, manufacturing, construction, transportation, and film and television production sectors, such that no single sector is overwhelmingly dominant.

The diversification in Queens' economy is reflected in a large amount of employment in the export-oriented portions of its economy—such as transportation, manufacturing, and business services—that serve customers outside the region. This accounts for more than 27% of all Queens jobs and offers an average salary of $43,727, 14% greater than that of jobs in the locally oriented sector.

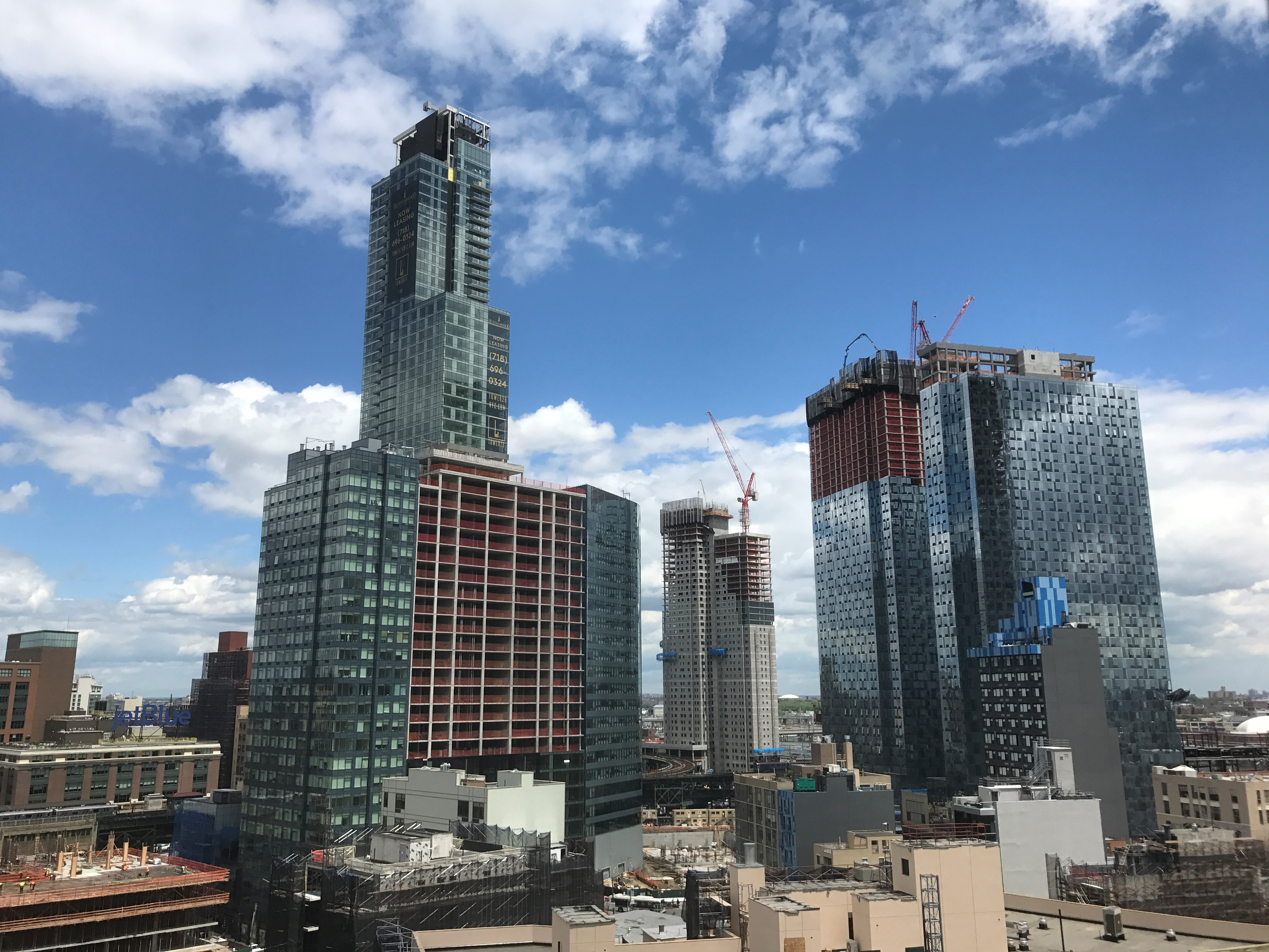
Long Island City is one of New York City's fastest-growing neighborhoods.

The borough's largest employment sector—trade, transportation, and utilities—accounted for nearly 30% of all jobs in 2004; in 2012, its largest employment sector became health care and social services. Queens is home to two of the three major New York City area airports, JFK International Airport and LaGuardia Airport. These airports are among the busiest in the world, leading the airspace above Queens to be the most congested in the country. This airline industry is particularly important to the economy of Queens, providing almost one-quarter of the sector's employment and more than 30% of the sector's wages.

Education and health services were the next largest sector in Queens and comprised almost 24% of the borough's jobs in 2004; in 2012, transportation and warehousing, and retail were the second largest at 12% each. The manufacturing and construction industries in Queens are among the largest of the city and accounted for nearly 17% of the borough's private sector jobs in 2004. Comprising almost 17% of the jobs in Queens is the information, financial activities, and business and professional services sectors in 2004.

As of 2003, Queens had almost 40,000 business establishments. Small businesses act as an important part of the borough's economic vitality with two-thirds of all businesses employing between one and four people.

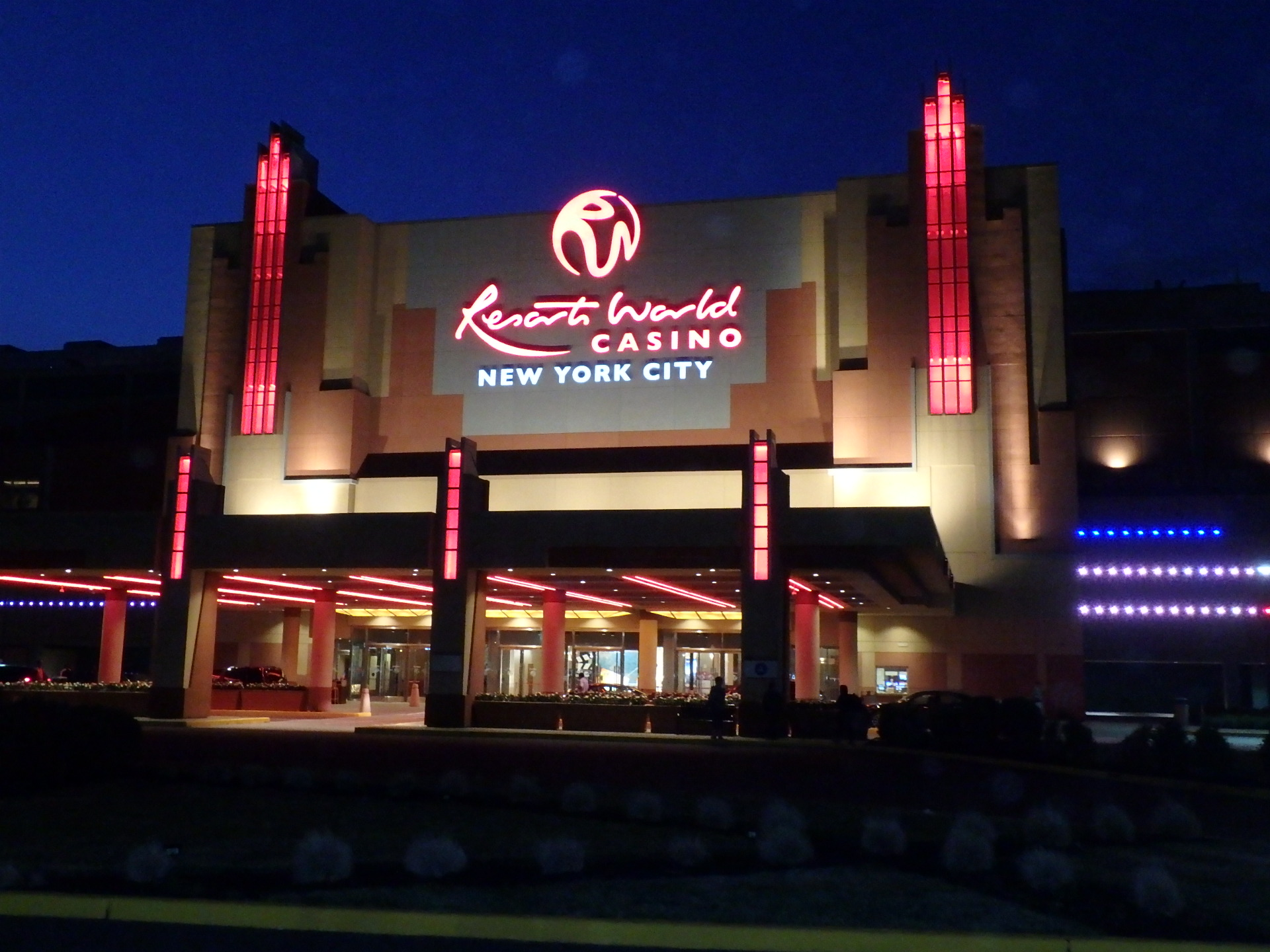
Resorts World New York City in Jamaica is the only casino hotel in New York City

Several large companies have their headquarters in Queens, including watchmaker Bulova, based in East Elmhurst; internationally renowned piano manufacturer Steinway & Sons in Astoria; Glacéau, the makers of Vitamin Water, headquartered in Whitestone; and JetBlue Airways, an airline based in Long Island City.

Long Island City is a major manufacturing and back-office center. Flushing is a major commercial hub for Chinese American and Korean American businesses, while Jamaica is the major civic and transportation hub for the borough.

Queens is home to Resorts World New York City which is the only casino hotel in New York City. The resort will be redeveloped into an integrated resort after securing a full casino license. Hard Rock Hotel & Casino Metropolitan Park will be built next to CitiField after being awarded a full casino license as well. Both these projects will be completed by 2030, making Queens home to two integrated resorts.

== Sports ==
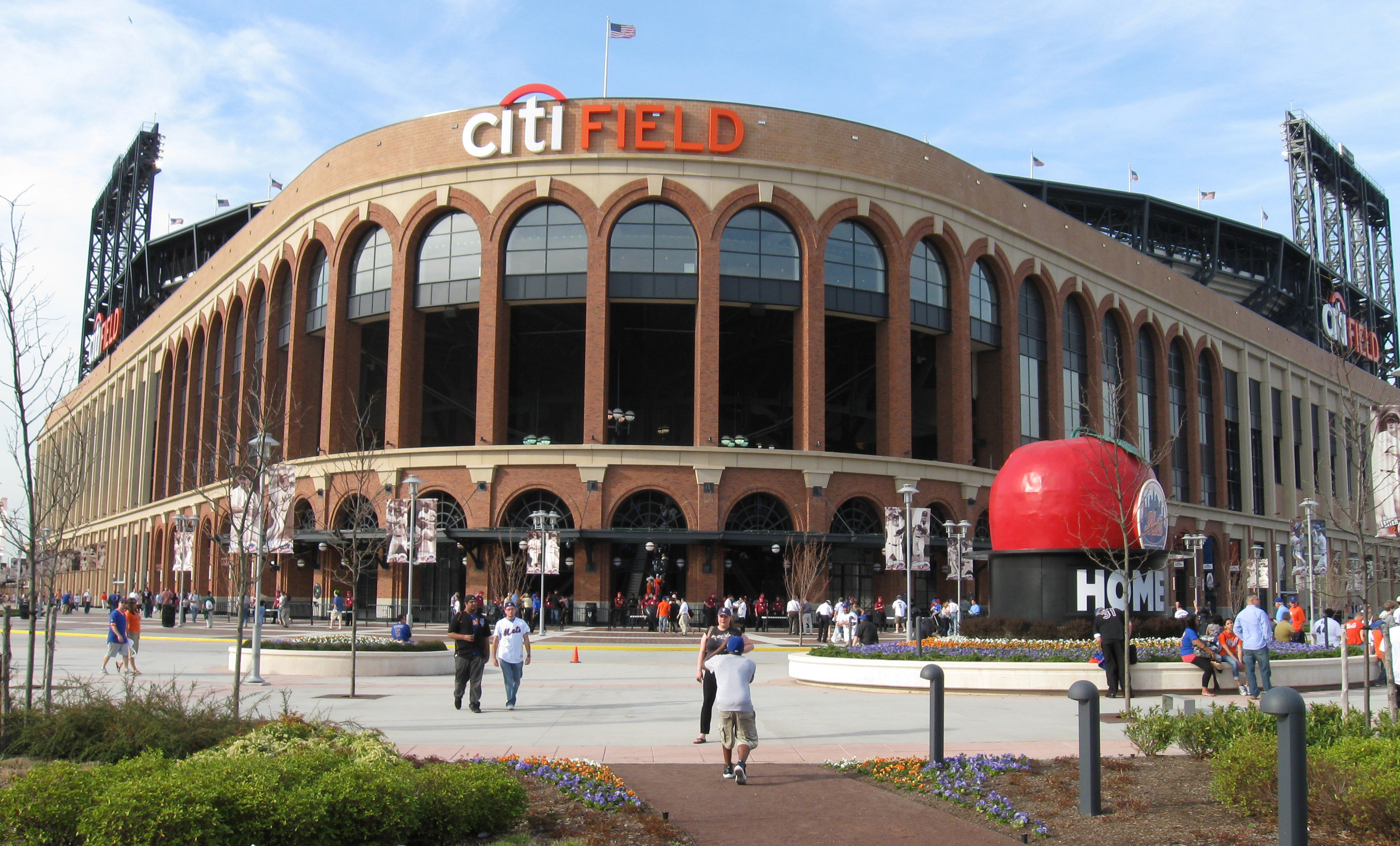
Citi Field, the home of the New York Mets

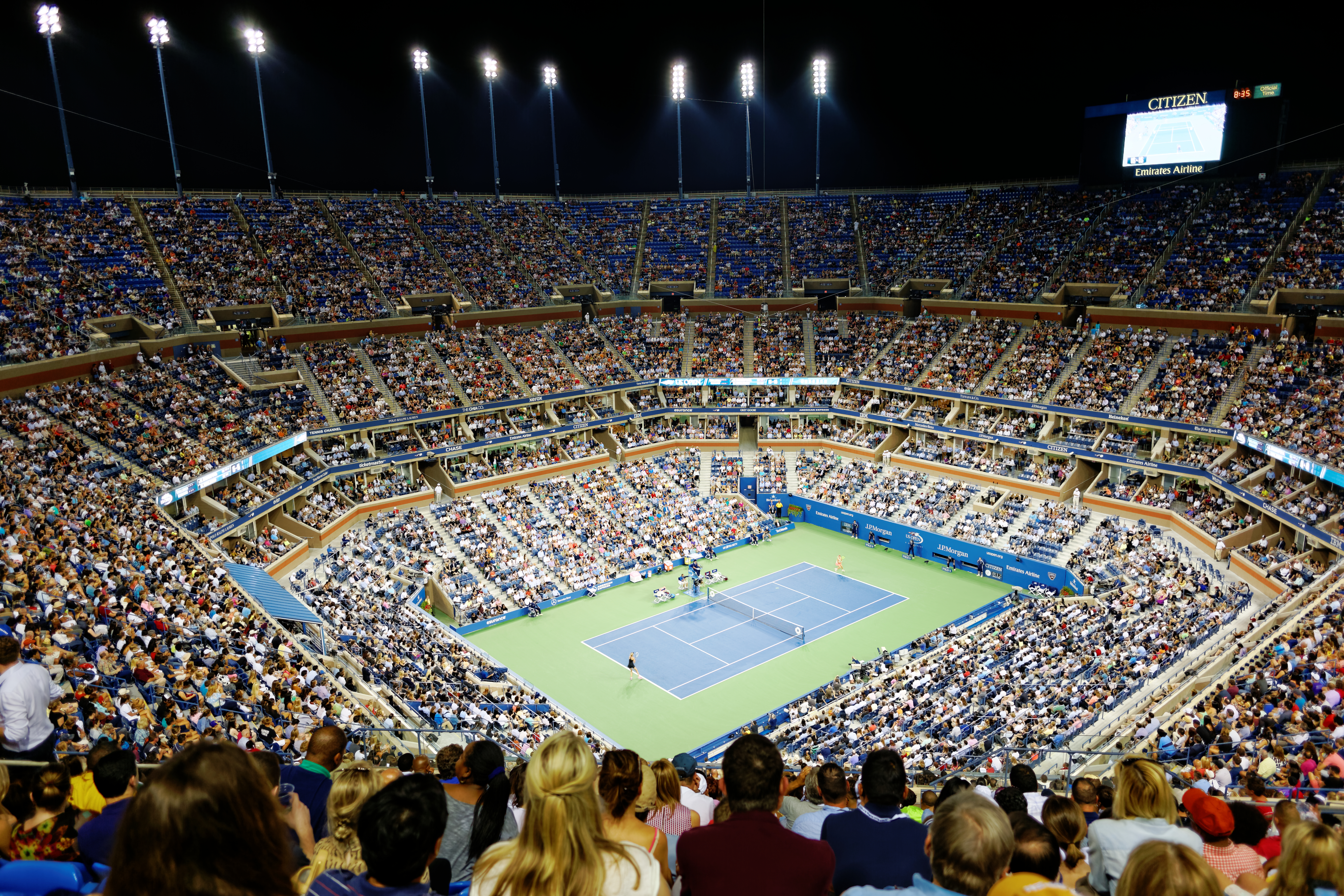
Arthur Ashe Stadium during the 2014 US Open

Queens is home of the New York Mets of Major League Baseball. Founded in 1962 as an expansion team. it has won two World Series championships and five National League pennants. It played its first two seasons in its temporary home of the Polo Grounds in Manhattan, then relocated to Shea Stadium in Flushing in 1964. The home ballpark of the Mets is Citi Field, a 41,922-seat stadium opened in April 2009 in Flushing Meadows–Corona Park.

Shea Stadium was located in the current Citi Field's parking lot from 1964 to 2008. It was the home of the Mets and the New York Jets of the National Football League, as well as the temporary home of the New York Yankees and the New York Giants Football Team. Queens is the future home of Etihad Park for New York City FC of Major League Soccer and Gotham FC of the National Women’s Soccer League, which is expected to be completed in 2027. Etihad Park will host nine soccer matches during the 2028 Summer Olympics, including a men's quarter-final.

The U.S. Open tennis tournament has been played since 1978 at the USTA Billie Jean King National Tennis Center, located just south of Citi Field. With a capacity of 23,771, Arthur Ashe Stadium is the biggest tennis stadium in the world. The U.S. Open was formerly played at the West Side Tennis Club in Forest Hills.

South Ozone Park was the home of Aqueduct Racetrack, opened in 1894, which was operated by the New York Racing Association and offered Thoroughbred horse racing from late October/early November through April until its closure in 2026.

The Belmont Park racetrack and the adjacent UBS Arena (home of the New York Islanders of the National Hockey League) sit entirely in Nassau County, just over the City line. However, small sections of the properties of both venues are in Queens, as is the Belmont Park station of the Long Island Rail Road.

== Government ==
Party affiliation of Queens registered voters
Party	2006	2005	2004	2003	2002	2001	2000	1999	1998	1997	1996
Democratic	62.97%	62.94	62.52	62.85	62.79	62.99	62.52	62.30	62.27	62.28	62.33
Republican	14.47%	14.60	14.66	14.97	15.04	15.28	15.69	16.47	16.74	16.93	17.20
Other	3.86%	3.88	3.93	3.94	3.86	3.37	3.30	3.10	3.20	3.02	2.78
No affiliation	18.70%	18.58	18.89	18.24	18.31	18.36	18.49	18.13	17.79	17.77	17.69

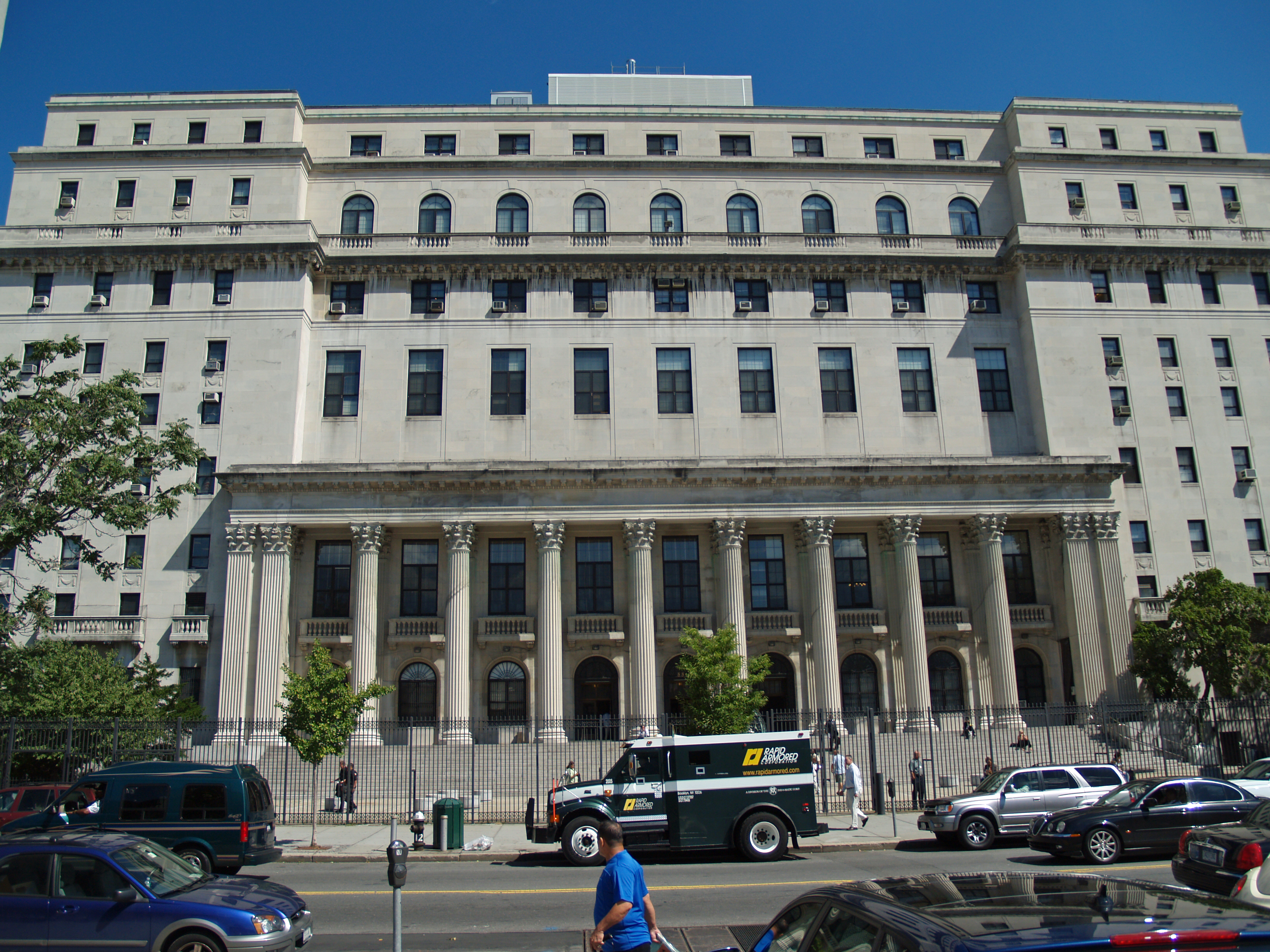
Queens County Courthouse was built in 1938 and houses the borough's Supreme Court, Surrogate Court, and County Clerk.

Since New York City's consolidation in 1898, Queens has been governed by the New York City Charter that provides for a strong mayor–council system. The centralized New York City government is responsible for public education, correctional institutions, public safety, recreational facilities, sanitation, water supply, and welfare services in Queens. The Queens Library is governed by a 19-member Board of Trustees, appointed by the Mayor of New York City and the Borough President of Queens.

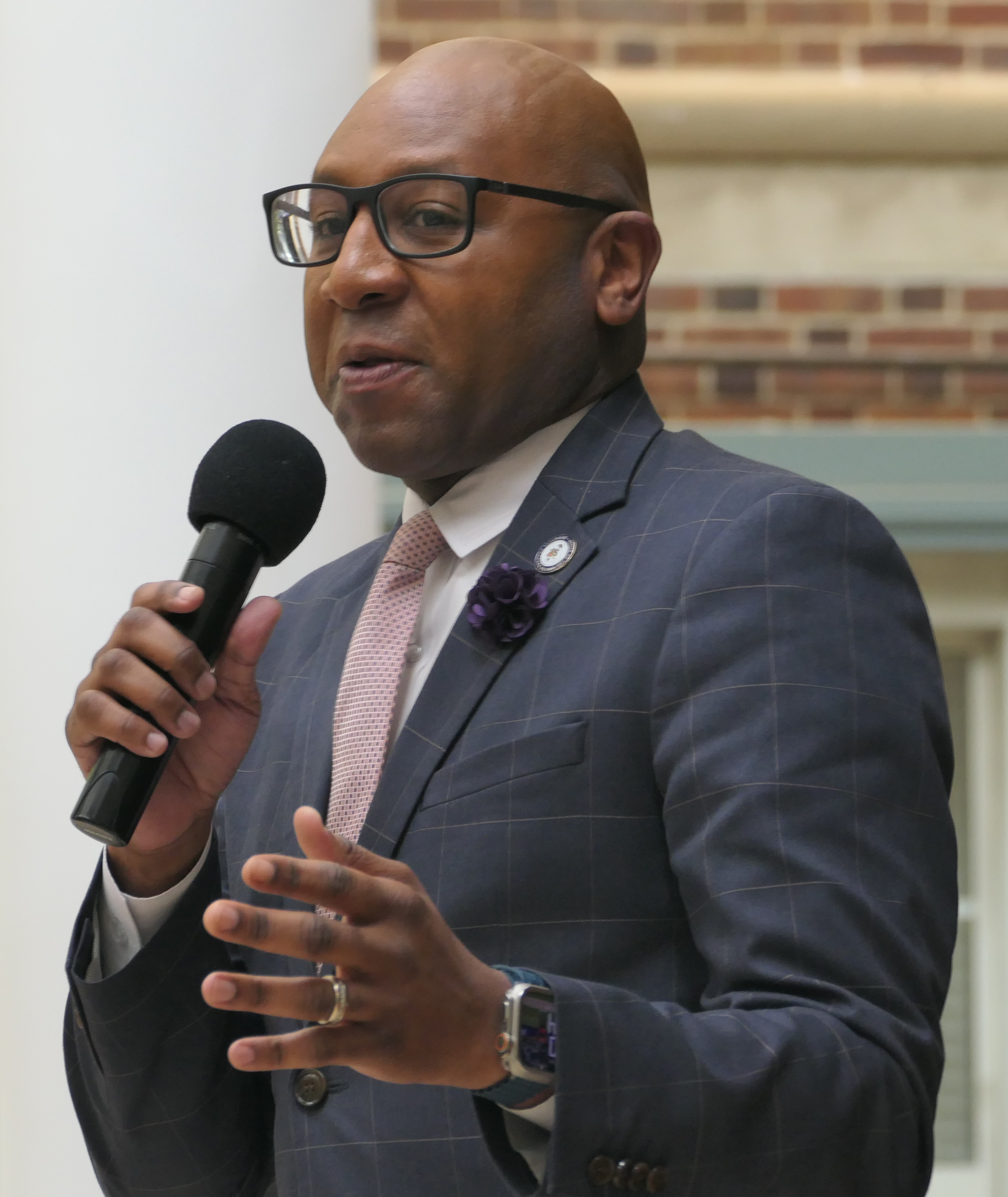
Queens borough president Donovan Richards

Since 1990, the Borough President has acted as an advocate for the borough at the mayoral agencies, the City Council, the New York state government, and corporations. Queens' Borough President is Donovan Richards, elected in November 2020 as a Democrat. Queens Borough Hall is the seat of government and is located in Kew Gardens.

United States presidential election results for Queens County, New York
Year	Republican / Whig		Democratic		Third party(ies)	
Year	No.	%	No.	%	No.	%
1828	1,379	54.98%	1,129	45.02%	0	0.00%
1832	1,400	45.83%	1,655	54.17%	0	0.00%
1836	1,399	45.82%	1,654	54.18%	0	0.00%
1840	2,522	49.70%	2,550	50.26%	2	0.04%
1844	2,547	48.07%	2,751	51.93%	0	0.00%
1848	2,444	53.66%	1,310	28.76%	801	17.59%
1852	2,209	43.06%	2,904	56.61%	17	0.33%
1856	1,886	27.73%	2,394	35.20%	2,521	37.07%
1860	3,749	46.05%	4,392	53.95%	0	0.00%
1864	4,284	44.24%	5,400	55.76%	0	0.00%
1868	4,973	43.77%	6,388	56.23%	0	0.00%
1872	6,083	51.74%	5,655	48.10%	19	0.16%
1876	6,970	40.99%	9,994	58.77%	41	0.24%
1880	8,151	43.73%	10,391	55.74%	99	0.53%
1884	8,445	43.80%	10,367	53.76%	471	2.44%
1888	11,017	45.95%	12,683	52.90%	275	1.15%
1892	11,704	41.71%	15,195	54.15%	1,161	4.14%
1896	18,694	58.03%	11,980	37.19%	1,539	4.78%
1900	12,323	43.94%	14,747	52.58%	976	3.48%
1904	14,096	41.44%	18,151	53.36%	1,770	5.20%
1908	19,420	44.13%	20,342	46.22%	4,246	9.65%
1912	9,201	16.49%	28,076	50.32%	18,521	33.19%
1916	34,670	50.54%	31,350	45.70%	2,575	3.75%
1920	94,360	68.71%	35,296	25.70%	7,668	5.58%
1924	100,793	53.57%	58,402	31.04%	28,974	15.40%
1928	158,505	45.87%	184,640	53.43%	2,411	0.70%
1932	136,641	34.32%	244,740	61.47%	16,760	4.21%
1936	162,797	33.02%	320,053	64.92%	10,159	2.06%
1940	323,406	52.68%	288,024	46.91%	2,524	0.41%
1944	365,365	55.33%	292,940	44.36%	2,071	0.31%
1948	323,459	50.58%	268,742	42.02%	47,342	7.40%
1952	450,610	57.11%	331,217	41.98%	7,194	0.91%
1956	466,057	59.39%	318,723	40.61%	0	0.00%
1960	367,688	45.07%	446,348	54.71%	1,863	0.23%
1964	274,351	33.59%	541,418	66.28%	1,059	0.13%
1968	306,620	40.03%	410,546	53.60%	48,746	6.36%
1972	426,015	56.34%	328,316	43.42%	1,756	0.23%
1976	244,396	38.95%	379,907	60.54%	3,200	0.51%
1980	251,333	44.81%	269,147	47.98%	40,443	7.21%
1984	285,477	46.38%	328,379	53.34%	1,722	0.28%
1988	217,049	39.70%	325,147	59.47%	4,533	0.83%
1992	157,561	28.34%	349,520	62.87%	48,875	8.79%
1996	107,650	21.06%	372,925	72.95%	30,631	5.99%
2000	122,052	21.95%	416,967	75.00%	16,972	3.05%
2004	165,954	27.41%	433,835	71.66%	5,603	0.93%
2008	155,221	24.25%	480,692	75.09%	4,224	0.66%
2012	118,589	19.92%	470,732	79.08%	5,924	1.00%
2016	149,341	21.76%	517,220	75.35%	19,832	2.89%
2020	212,665	26.92%	569,038	72.03%	8,278	1.05%
2024	264,628	36.96%	437,282	61.08%	14,054	1.96%

The Democratic Party holds most public offices. Sixty-three percent of registered Queens voters are Democrats. Local party platforms center on affordable housing, education, and economic development. Controversial political issues in Queens include development, noise, and the cost of housing.

Queens, like all of the city's five counties, has its own criminal court system and District Attorney, the chief public prosecutor who is directly elected by popular vote. Since January 2020, the District Attorney of Queens County is Melinda Katz. Queens has 12 seats on the New York City Council, the second-largest number among the five boroughs. It is divided into 14 community districts, each served by a local Community Board. Community Boards are representative bodies that field complaints and serve as advocates for residents.

Although Queens is heavily Democratic, it is considered a swing county in New York politics. Republican political candidates who do well in Queens usually win citywide or statewide elections. Republicans such as former Mayors Rudolph Giuliani and Michael Bloomberg won majorities in Queens. Republican State Senator Serphin R. Maltese represented a district in central and southern Queens for twenty years until his defeat in 2008 by Democratic City Councilman Joseph Addabbo Jr. In 2002, Queens voted against incumbent Republican Governor of New York George Pataki in favor of his Democratic opponent, Carl McCall by a slim margin.

On the national level, Queens has not voted for a Republican candidate in a presidential election since 1972, when Queens voters chose Richard Nixon over George McGovern. From 1996 until 2024, Democratic presidential candidates received over 70% of the popular vote in Queens, with Kamala Harris being the first Democrat to receive less than 70% of the borough's votes since Bill Clinton in 1992. Since the first election of Donald Trump in 2016, Queens has become known in the United States for its surge in progressive politics and grassroots campaigning. During his third run for president in 2024, Donald Trump cracked 37% in Queens, which was the strongest performance for a Republican since 1988.

=== Federal representation ===
As of 2024, five Democrats represent Queens in the United States House of Representatives.

- Tom Suozzi (first elected in 2016) represents New York's 3rd congressional district, which covers the northeast Queens neighborhoods of Little Neck, Whitestone, Glen Oaks, Queens Village and Floral Park. The district also covers the North Shore of Nassau County.
- Gregory Meeks (first elected in 1998) represents New York's 5th congressional district, which covers the entire Rockaway Peninsula as well as the southeast Queens neighborhoods of Broad Channel, Cambria Heights, Hollis, Jamaica, Laurelton, Rosedale, Saint Albans, Springfield Gardens, and South Ozone Park. The district also includes John F. Kennedy International Airport.
- Grace Meng (first elected in 2012) represents New York's 6th congressional district, which includes the central and eastern Queens neighborhoods of Auburndale, Bayside, Elmhurst, Flushing, Forest Hills, Glendale, Kew Gardens, Maspeth, Middle Village, Murray Hill, and Rego Park.
- Nydia Velázquez (first elected in 1992) represents New York's 7th congressional district, which includes the Queens neighborhoods of Maspeth, Ridgewood, Woodhaven, Sunnyside and Long Island City. The district also covers central and western Brooklyn.
- Alexandria Ocasio-Cortez (first elected in 2018) represents New York's 14th congressional district, which includes the northwest Queens neighborhoods of Astoria, College Point, Corona, East Elmhurst, Jackson Heights, Woodside, and Elmhurst. The district also covers the East Bronx.

== Housing ==
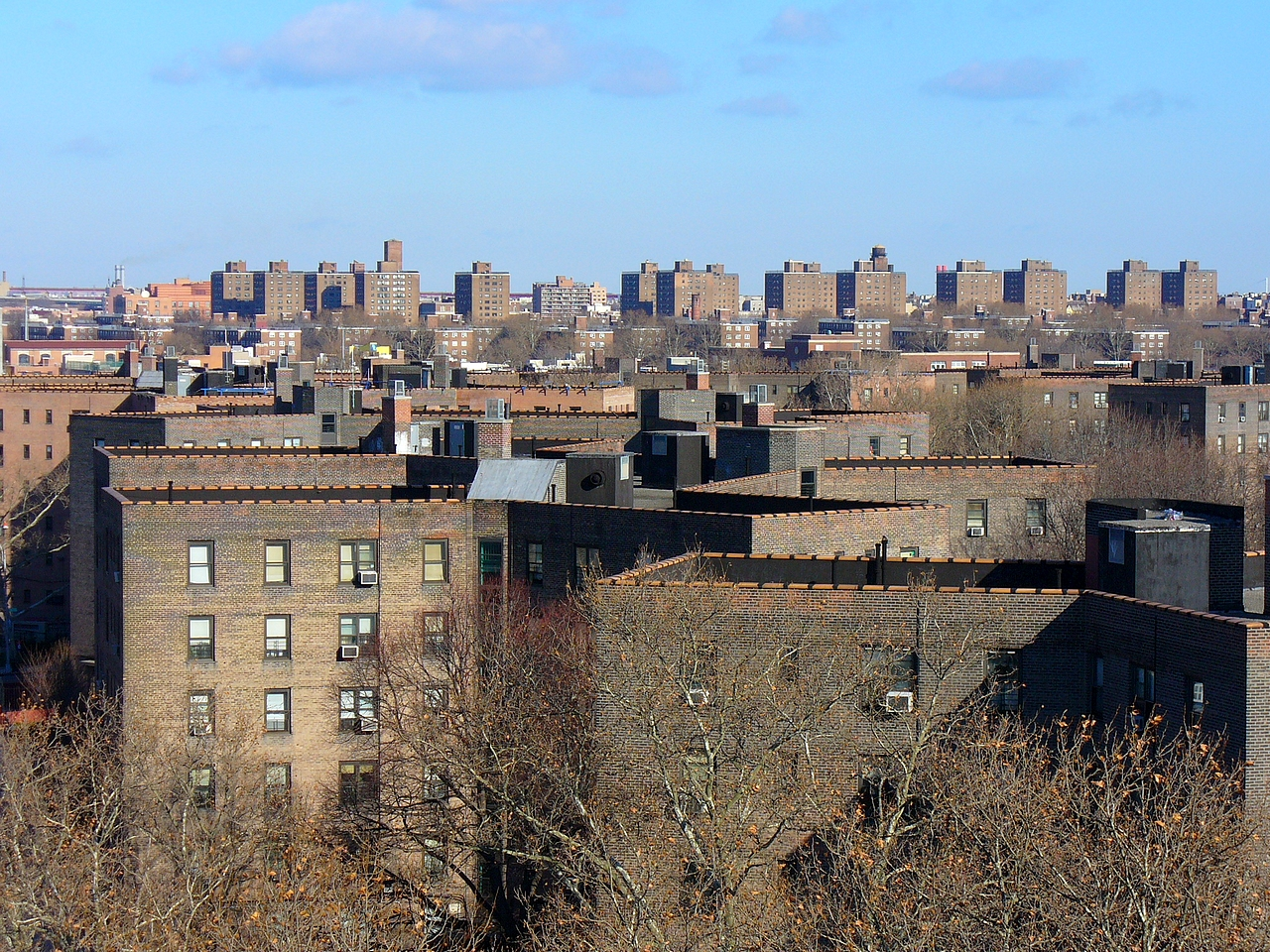
Queensbridge Houses, a public housing development in the Long Island City neighborhood of Queens

The borough's diverse housing ranges from high-rise apartment buildings in some areas of western and central Queens, such as Forest Hills, Jackson Heights, Flushing, Astoria, and Long Island City; to lower-rise neighborhoods in the eastern part of the borough. There were 911,957 housing units in 2022 at an average density of 8,388 units per square mile (3,239/km^{2}). Affordable rental and co-operative housing units throughout the borough were created under the Mitchell–Lama Housing Program. Public housing is administered by the New York City Housing Authority, which accounts for more than 30,000 residents in more than 15,300 units in 2023.

== Education ==
=== Elementary and secondary education ===
Elementary and secondary school education in Queens is provided by a vast number of public and private institutions. Non-charter public schools in the borough are managed by the New York City Department of Education, the largest public school system in the United States. Most private schools are affiliated with or identify themselves with the Roman Catholic or Jewish religious communities. Townsend Harris High School is a Queens public magnet high school for the humanities consistently ranked as among the top 100 high schools in the United States. One of the nine Specialized High Schools in New York City is located in Queens. Located in the York College, City University of New York Campus in Jamaica, the Queens High School for the Sciences at York College, which emphasizes both science and mathematics, ranks as one of the best high schools in both the state and the country. It is one of the smallest Specialized High Schools that requires an entrance exam, the Specialized High Schools Admissions Test. The school has a student body of around 400 students.

=== Postsecondary institutions ===
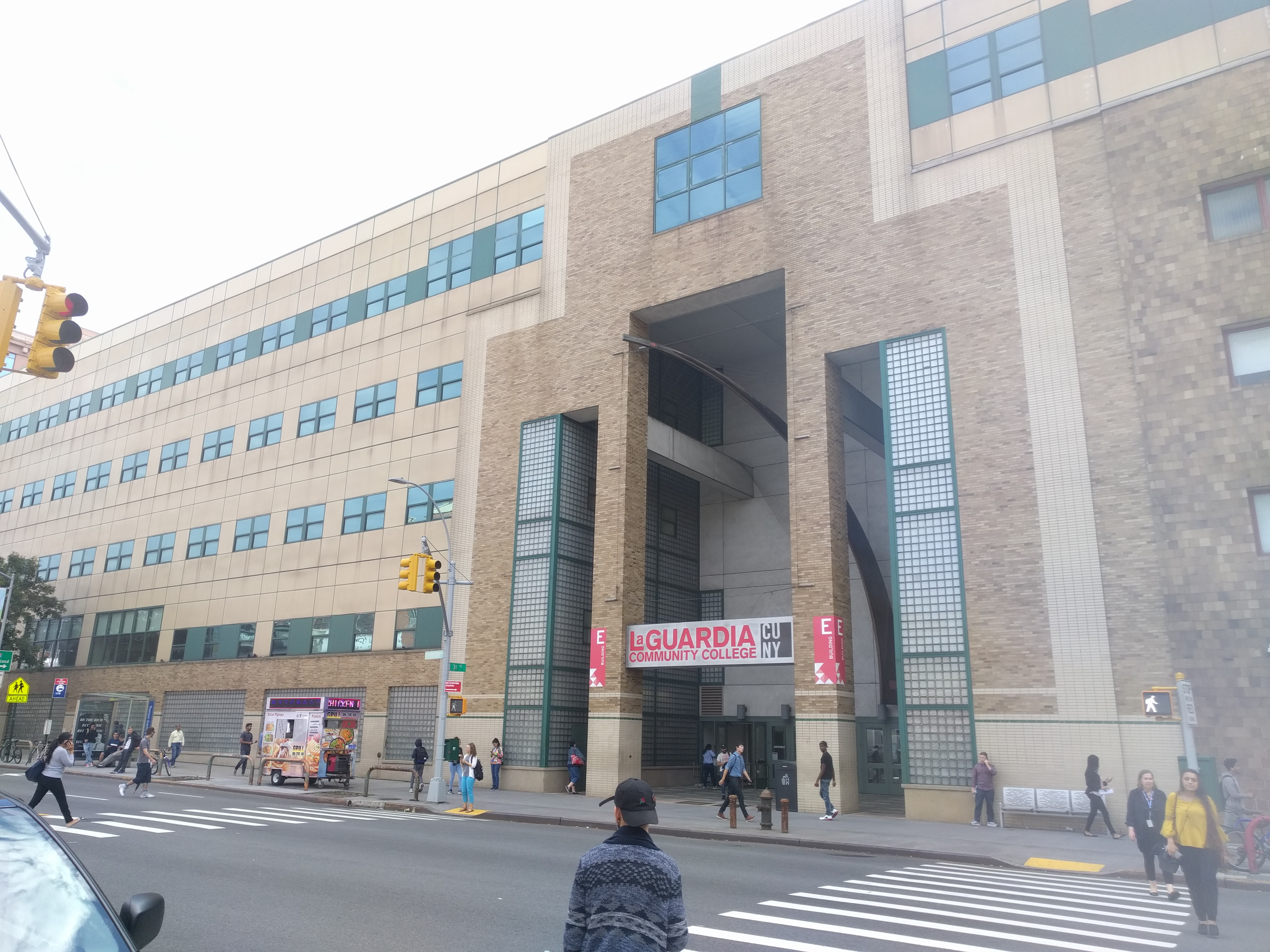
LaGuardia Community College in Long Island City, Queens

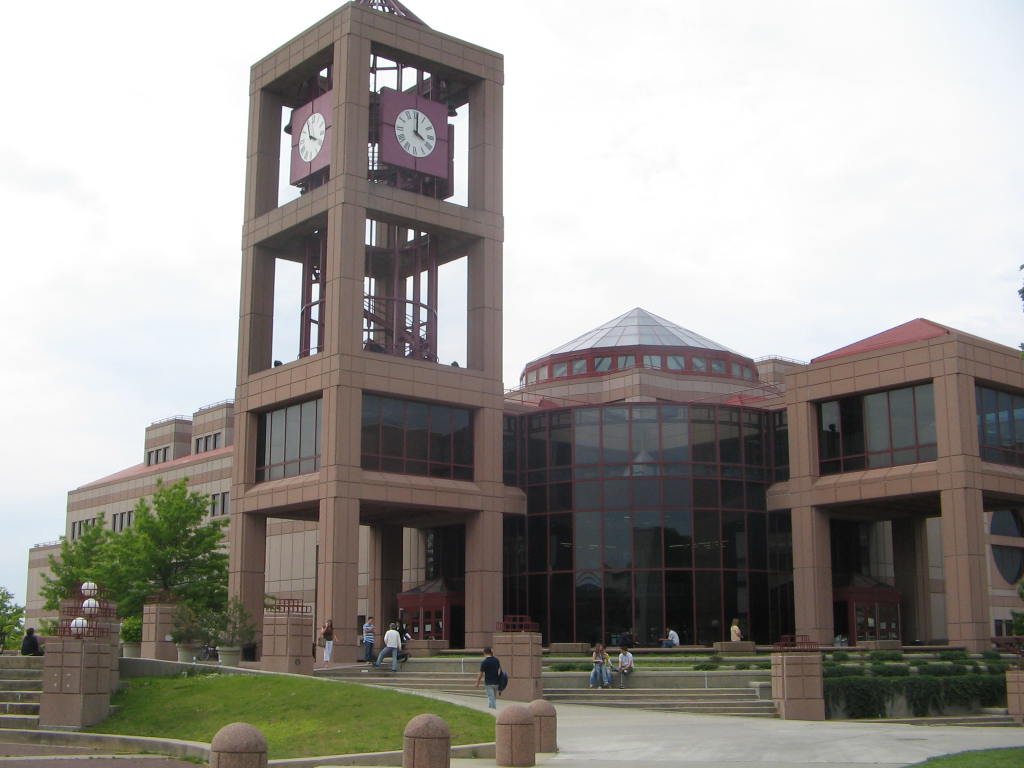
Queens College is part of the City University of New York.

- LaGuardia Community College, part of the City University of New York (CUNY), is known as "The World's Community College" for its diverse international student body representing more than 150 countries and speaking over 100 languages. The college has been named a National Institution of Excellence by the Policy Center on the First Year of College. In a 2003 benchmark survey, in the Large Community College category (8,000–14,999 students), LaGuardia was one of three community colleges ranked number one, nationally. The college hosts the LaGuardia and Wagner Archives.
- Queens College is one of the elite colleges in the CUNY system. Established in 1937 to offer a strong liberal arts education to the residents of the borough, Queens College has over 16,000 students including more than 12,000 undergraduates and over 4,000 graduate students. Students from 120 countries speaking 66 different languages are enrolled at the school, which is located in Flushing. Queens College is also the host of CUNY's law school. The Queens College Campus is also the home of Townsend Harris High School and the Queens College School for Math, Science, and Technology (PS/IS 499).
- Queensborough Community College, originally part of the State University of New York, is in Bayside and is now part of CUNY. It prepares students to attend senior colleges mainly in the CUNY system.
- St. John's University is a private, coeducational Roman Catholic university founded in 1870 by the Vincentian Fathers. With over 19,000 students, St. John's is known for its pharmacy, business and law programs as well as its men's basketball and soccer teams.
- Vaughn College of Aeronautics and Technology is a private, cutting edge, degree-granting institution located across the Grand Central Parkway from LaGuardia Airport. Its presence underscores the importance of aviation to the Queens economy.
- York College is one of CUNY's leading general-purpose liberal arts colleges, granting bachelor's degrees in more than 40 fields, as well as a combined BS/MS degree in Occupational Therapy. Noted for its Health Sciences Programs York College is also home to the Northeast Regional Office of the Food and Drug Administration.

=== Queens Public Library ===
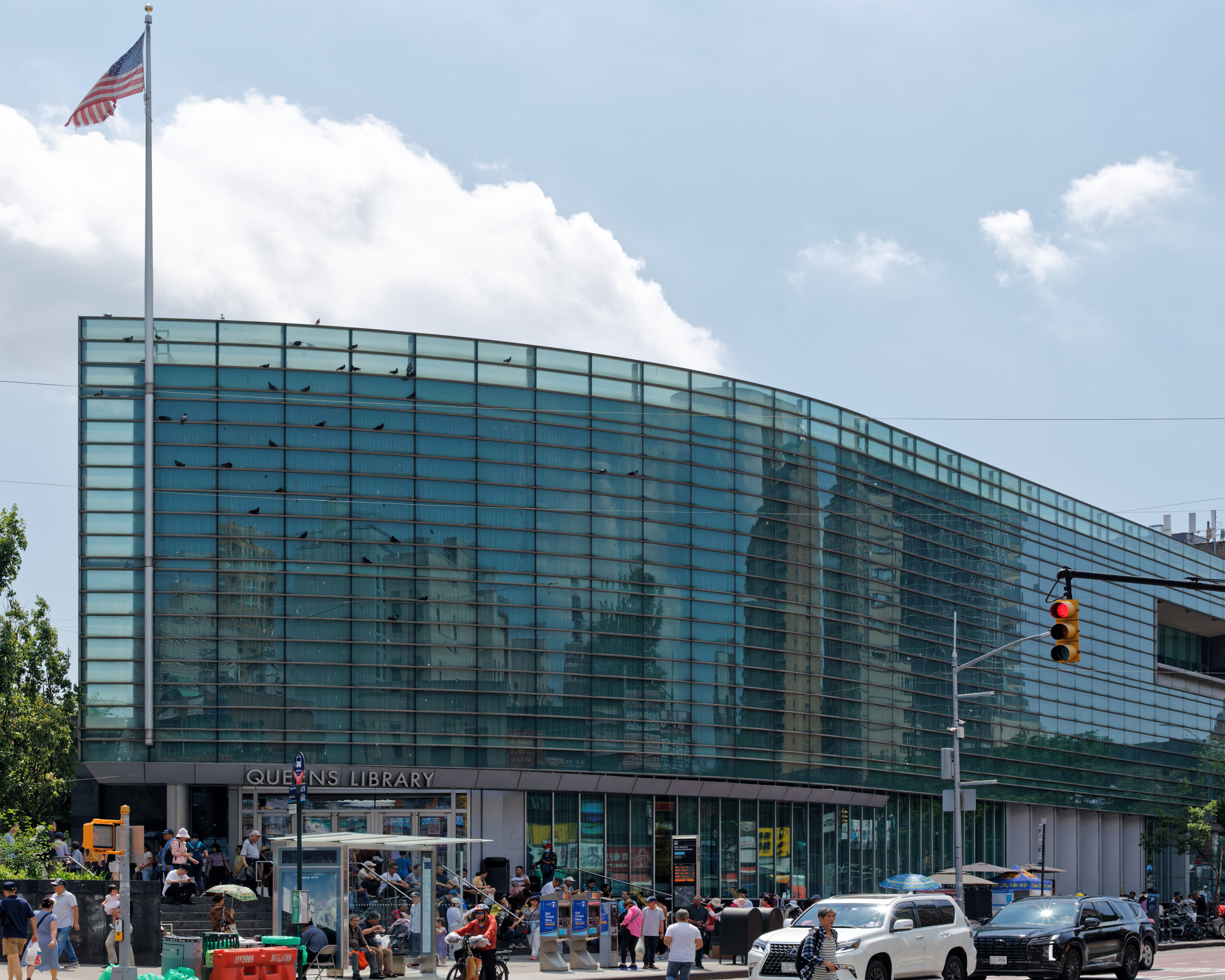
A branch of the Queens Public Library in Flushing

The Queens Public Library is the public library system for the borough and one of three library systems serving New York City. Dating back to the foundation of the first Queens library in Flushing in 1858, the Queens Public Library is one of the largest public library systems in the United States. Separate from the New York Public Library, it is composed of 63 branches throughout the borough. In the fiscal year 2001, the Library achieved a circulation of 16.8 million. The Library has maintained the highest circulation of any city library in the country since 1985 and the highest circulation of any library in the nation since 1987. The Library maintains collections in many languages, including Spanish, Chinese, Korean, Russian, Haitian Creole, Polish, and six Indic languages, as well as smaller collections in 19 other languages.

== Transportation ==
According to 2011–2015 ACS microdata, 38% of Queens households did not own a car; the citywide rate is 55%.

=== Vehicles for hire ===
As of 2019, the city had about 80,000 for-hire vehicles, of which, two-thirds were ride-hail – Uber, Lyft, Via, and Juno. Until the COVID-19 pandemic, the ride-hail car offered a ride-share option. There are about 13,500 traditional taxis (yellow cabs with medallions) in the city, 7,676 boro taxis, 38,791 black cars, 21,932 livery cars, 288 commuter vans, and 2,206 paratransit vehicles.

=== Roundtrip car sharing ===
Zipcar, and others, entered New York City market in 2002 offering roundtrip car sharing from private locations, mostly from parking garages. In 2018, the city partnered with the roundtrip car share companies, led by Zipcar, to launch the nation's largest on-street car-sharing program with the greatest take-up in The Bronx and in Queens – Jackson Heights, Jamaica, and Far Rockaway. In 2020, during beginning throes of the COVID-19 pandemic, Enterprise CarShare suspended service in New York City. Among the traditional car rental locations in Queens, both international airports harbor larger fleets, conveniently close to Queens residents.

=== Micromobility ===
Citi Bike – a docked-bike and e-bike sharing company had, as of July 2019, 169,000 annual subscribers. In 2021, the Department of Transportation and Citi Bike announced that, as part of its Phase 3 expansion, it was doubling its service area to 70 square miles and tripling the number of bikes to 40,000. The expansion includes 52 new docking stations in Astoria, as well as new stations in Sunnyside and Woodside.

Non-docked e-moped service was launched in the city by Revel in 2019. Companies such as Bird, Lime, and Veo introduced non-docked e-scooter-sharing in 2021.

=== Airports ===
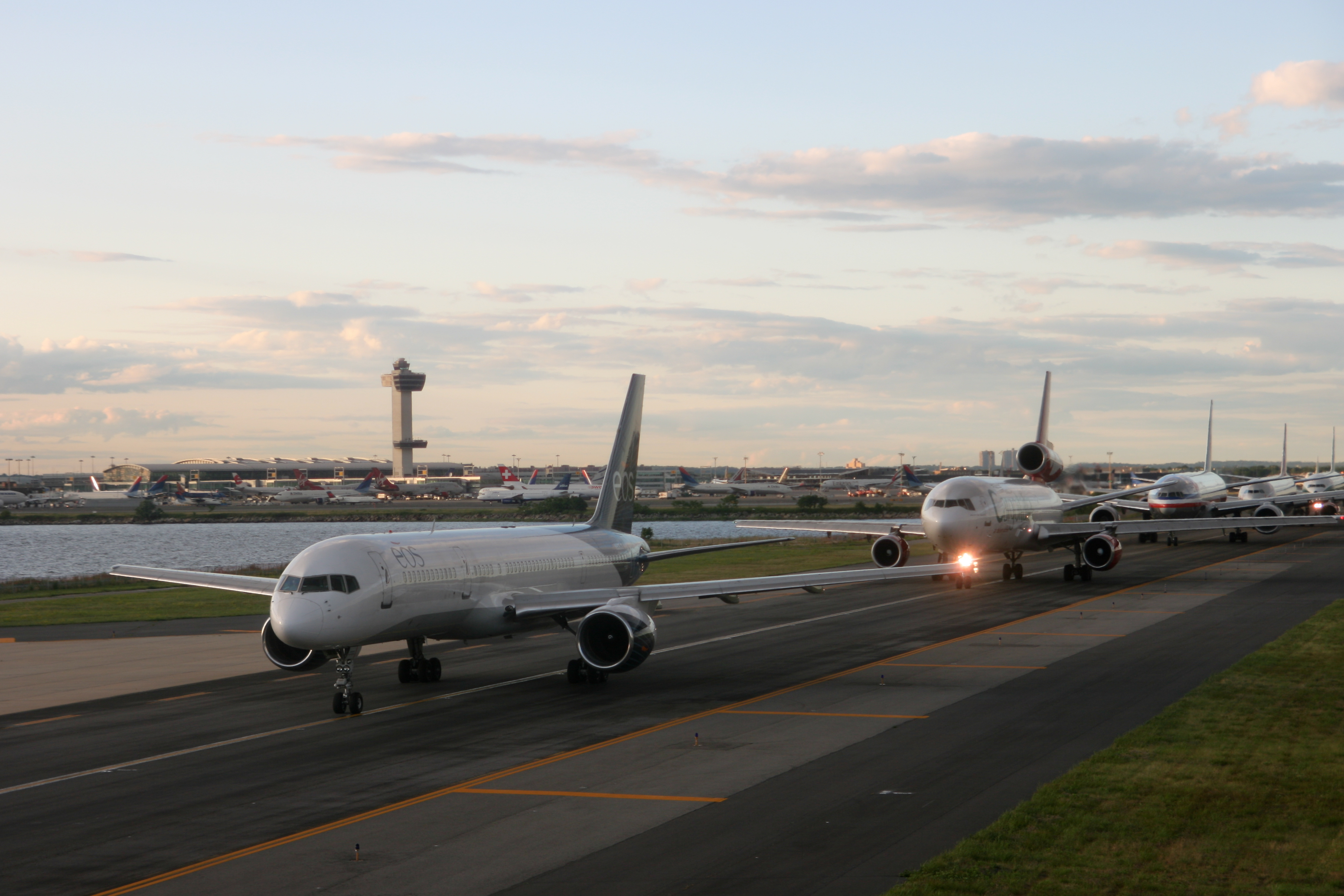
John F. Kennedy Airport in Queens, the busiest international air passenger gateway to the United States

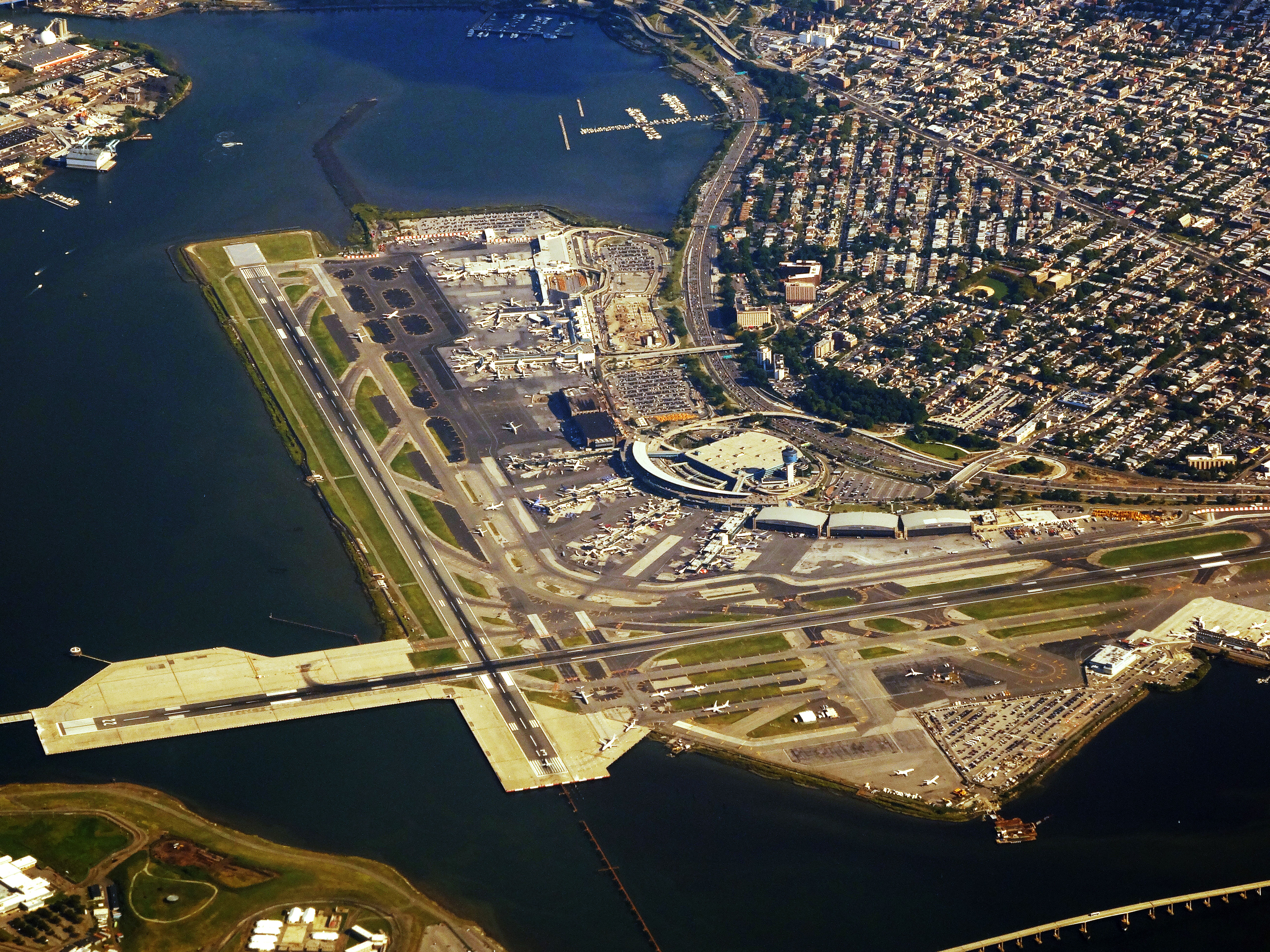
A multibillion-dollar reconstruction of LaGuardia Airport was announced in July 2015.

Airline Revenue Passengers
at Queens Airports

2019 → pre-COVID-19 pandemic

Domestic

International

Rank*

Total

JFK
28,233,791
34,317,281
❶
62,551,072
LGA

28,875,041

2,209,853

31,084,894

Total
57,108,832
36,527,134

93,635,966

2020 → mid-COVID-19 pandemic

JFK
8,267,666
8,362,976
❶
16,630,642
LGA

7,853,368

391,824

8,245,192

Total
16,121,034
8,754,800

24,875,834
*National rank for international passengers
(enplanements + deplanements)

Queens has crucial importance in international and interstate air traffic, with two of the New York metropolitan area's three major airports located there. John F. Kennedy International Airport (JFK), in 2019, before the COVID-19 pandemic, served 62.6 million passengers (enplanements + deplanements) – 34.3 million of which were international, ranking it the busiest airport in the United States by international passenger traffic. In response to the COVID-19 pandemic, the United States imposed travel restrictions, first, in January 2020, on travelers from China and, in the following months, on travelers from other countries. 2020 annual passenger traffic at JFK dropped to 16.6 million (−73.4%) – 8.4 million (−73.4%) of which were international, still ranking it the busiest airport in the United States by international passenger traffic.

JFK is owned by the City of New York and managed, since 1947, by the Port Authority of New York and New Jersey. The airport's runways and six terminals cover an area of 4,930 acres (2,000 ha) on Jamaica Bay in southeastern Queens. The airport's original official name was New York International Airport, although it was commonly known as Idlewild, with the name changed to Kennedy in December 1963 to honor the assassination of John F. Kennedy, November 22, 1963.

LaGuardia Airport is located in East Elmhurst, in northern Queens, on Flushing Bay. Originally opened in 1939, the airport's two runways and four terminals cover 680 acres (280 ha), serving 28.4 million passengers in 2015. In 2014, citing outdated conditions in the airport's terminals, Vice President Joe Biden compared LaGuardia Airport to a "third world country". In 2015, the Port Authority of New York and New Jersey began a $4 billion project to renovate LaGuardia Airport's terminals and entryways. The project is expected to be complete by 2021.

=== Public transportation ===
==== Subways ====
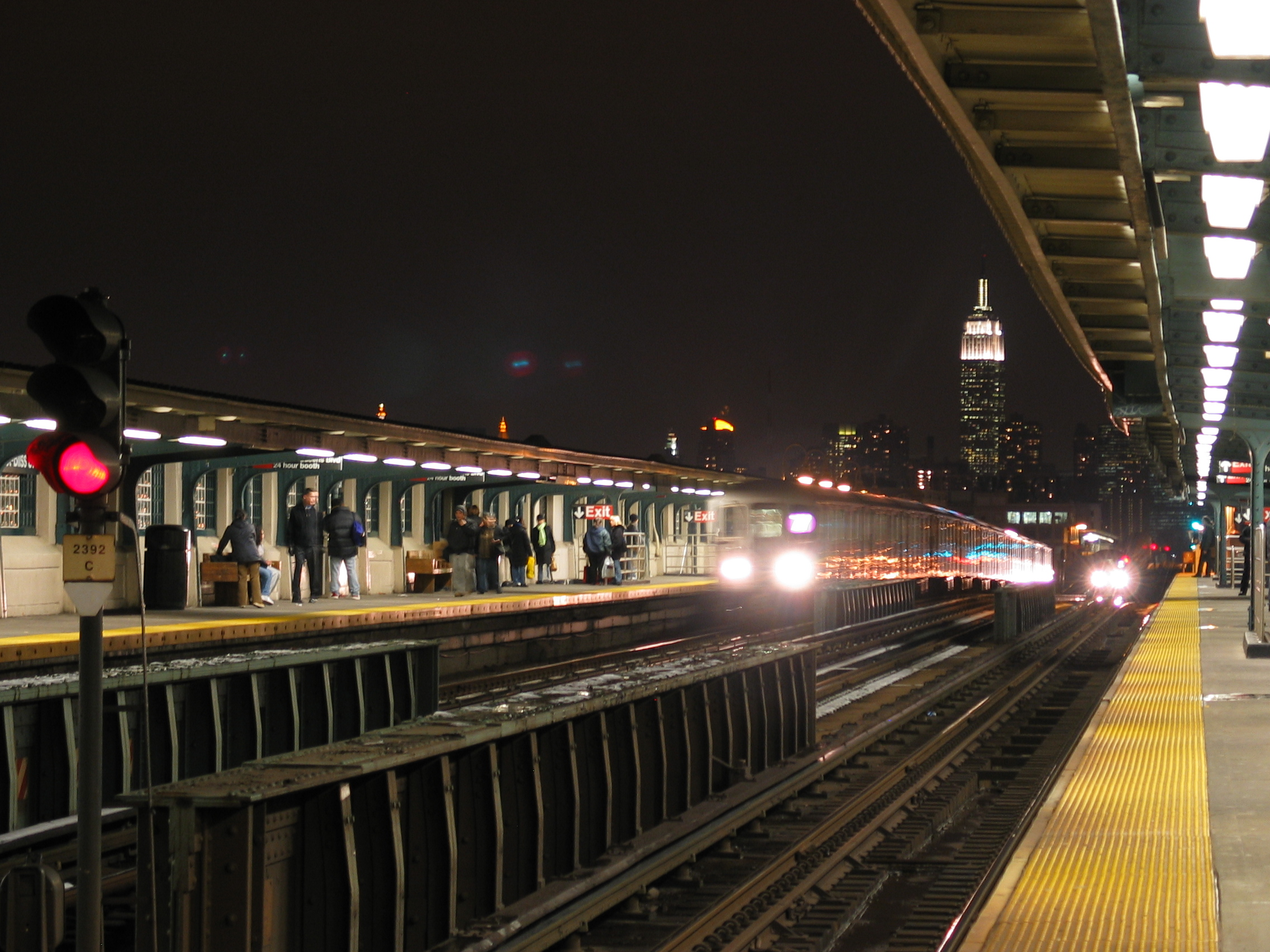
46th Street – Bliss Street subway station

Queens is served by the New York City Subway, with 81 stations located within the borough. Two physical lines — the IRT Flushing Line and the IND Queens Boulevard Line — serve as the primary east–west trunk lines in the borough, with all services on the two lines continuing across the East River into Manhattan. Two additional lines are wholly within Queens: the BMT Astoria Line, which serves the neighborhoods of Astoria and Ditmars–Steinway, and the IND Rockaway Line, which provides access to John F. Kennedy International Airport and the Rockaways. In addition, five other New York City Subway lines — the BMT Jamaica Line, BMT Myrtle Avenue Line, BMT/IND Archer Avenue Line, IND Crosstown Line, and IND Fulton Street Line — run between Brooklyn and Queens.

The A, G, J/Z, and M routes connect Queens to Brooklyn without going through Manhattan first. The F, N, and R trains connect Queens and Brooklyn via Manhattan, while the E, W, and 7/<7> trains connect Queens to Manhattan only. The L train briefly enters Queens at Halsey Street, connecting Queens to either Brooklyn or both Brooklyn and Manhattan, depending on the direction. In addition, the Rockaway Park Shuttle operates strictly in the neighborhoods of Rockaway Park and Broad Channel.

==== Long Island Rail Road ====
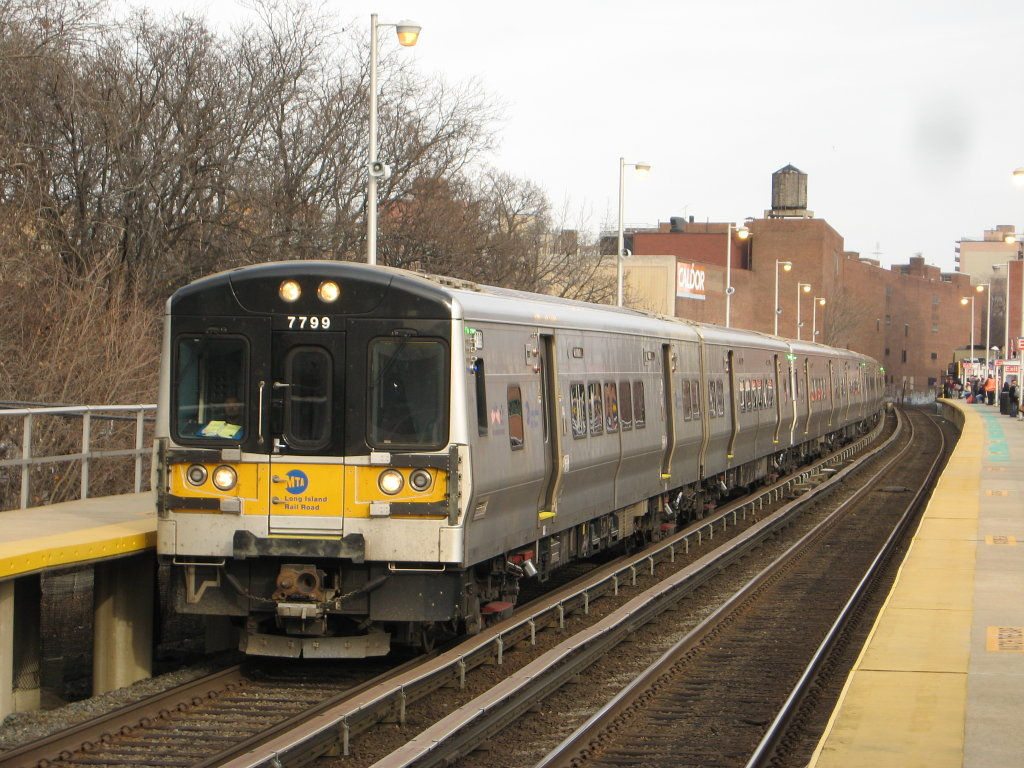
Flushing – Main Street LIRR station

The Long Island Rail Road, also part of the MTA, operates 24 hours a day, seven days a week, including holidays – carrying an average of 301,000 customers a day (80 million a year, adjusting downward for weekends) on about 735 scheduled trains. It is the busiest commuter rail hub in the United States. Most of its branches originate or terminate at Penn Station. All but one of its branches (the Port Washington Branch) pass through Jamaica. Within the City Terminal Zone, Queens has stations in Long Island City, Hunterspoint Avenue (in Long Island City), Bayside, Forest Hills, Flushing, Woodside, and Kew Gardens. There are also two stations where LIRR passengers can transfer to the subway.

Until 1998, the LIRR served 5 stations on the Lower Montauk branch between Jamaica and Hunterspoint Avenue. The LIRR used the track for non-stop service between Jamaica and Hunterspoint until 2012, when service was rerouted onto the main line and the line was leased to the New York and Atlantic Railway.

Sunnyside Yard is used to store Amtrak intercity and NJ Transit commuter trains from Penn Station in Manhattan. The US$11.1 billion East Side Access project, which brought LIRR trains to Grand Central Terminal in Manhattan, opened in 2023; this project created a new train tunnel beneath the East River, connecting Long Island City in Queens with the East Side of Manhattan.

==== JFK AirTrain ====
The elevated AirTrain people mover system connects JFK International Airport to the New York City Subway and the Long Island Rail Road along the Van Wyck Expressway; a separate AirTrain system is planned alongside the Grand Central Parkway to connect LaGuardia Airport to these transit systems. Plans were announced in July 2015 to entirely rebuild LaGuardia Airport itself in a multibillion-dollar project to replace its aging facilities, and this project would accommodate the new AirTrain connection.

==== MTA buses ====
2019 bus ridership, citywide, on the MTA system, was 2.2 million per average weekday – about 678 million for the year. In Queens, the Q58 and Q44 Select Bus Service were the seventh and tenth, respectively, citywide, busiest local lines in 2019. In addition to regular bus lines serving LaGuardia Airport, the MTA offers two Select Bus Services, regular fare, 24 hours a day, 7 days a week. The M60 – terminals A, B, C, D – to and from Manhattan via Grand Central Parkway and the Triborough Bridge – in Harlem, along 125th Street (with a stop at the 125th Street Metro-North station), ending in Morningside Heights on the Upper West Side, a few blocks south of Columbia University. The Q70 – terminals B, C, D – through Queens, ending in Woodside at 61st Street and Roosevelt Avenue. Overall, about 100 local bus routes operate within Queens, and another 20 express routes shuttle commuters between Queens and Manhattan, under the MTA New York City Bus and MTA Bus brands.

==== Proposed streetcar ====
A streetcar line connecting Queens with Brooklyn was proposed by the city in February 2016. The planned timeline originally called for service to begin around 2024. In September 2020, Mayor de Blasio deferred decisions on the project to after the 2021 New York City mayoral election.

==== Water transit ====
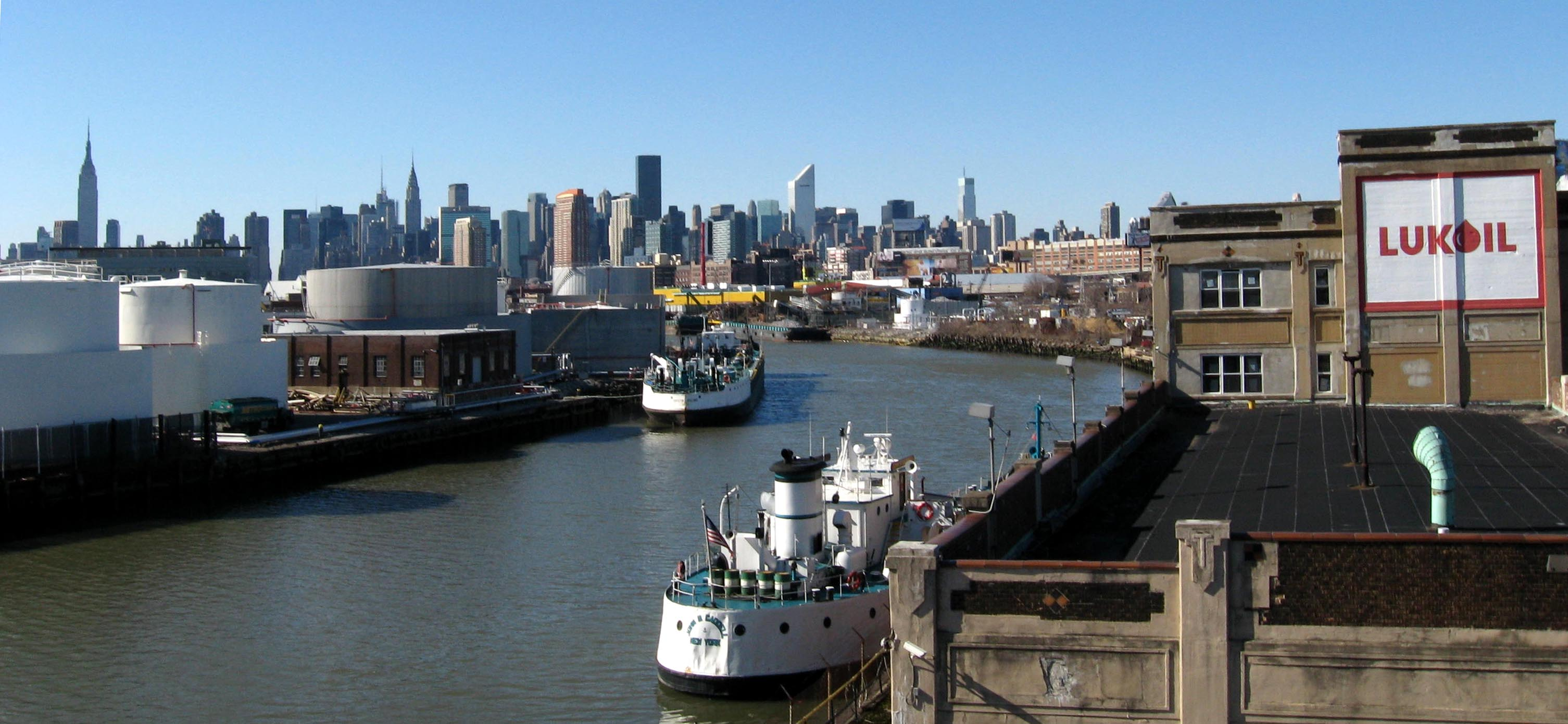
Newtown Creek with the Midtown Manhattan skyline in the background

New York Water Taxi operates service across the East River from Hunters Point in Long Island City to Manhattan at 34th Street and south to Pier 11 at Wall Street. In 2007, limited weekday service was begun between Breezy Point, the westernmost point in the Rockaways, to Pier 11 via the Brooklyn Army Terminal. Summertime weekend service provides service from Lower Manhattan and southwest Brooklyn to the peninsula's Gateway beaches.

In the aftermath of Hurricane Sandy on October 29, 2012, ferry operator SeaStreak began running a city-subsidized ferry service between a makeshift ferry slip at Beach 108th Street and Beach Channel Drive in Rockaway Park and piers in Manhattan and Brooklyn. The service was extended multiple times. finally ending on October 31, 2014.

In February 2015, Mayor Bill de Blasio announced that the city government would begin a citywide ferry service called NYC Ferry to extend ferry transportation to communities in the city that have been traditionally underserved by public transit. The ferry opened in May 2017, with the Queens neighborhoods of Rockaway and Astoria served by their eponymous routes. A third route, the East River Ferry, serves Hunter's Point South.

=== Roads ===
==== Highways ====
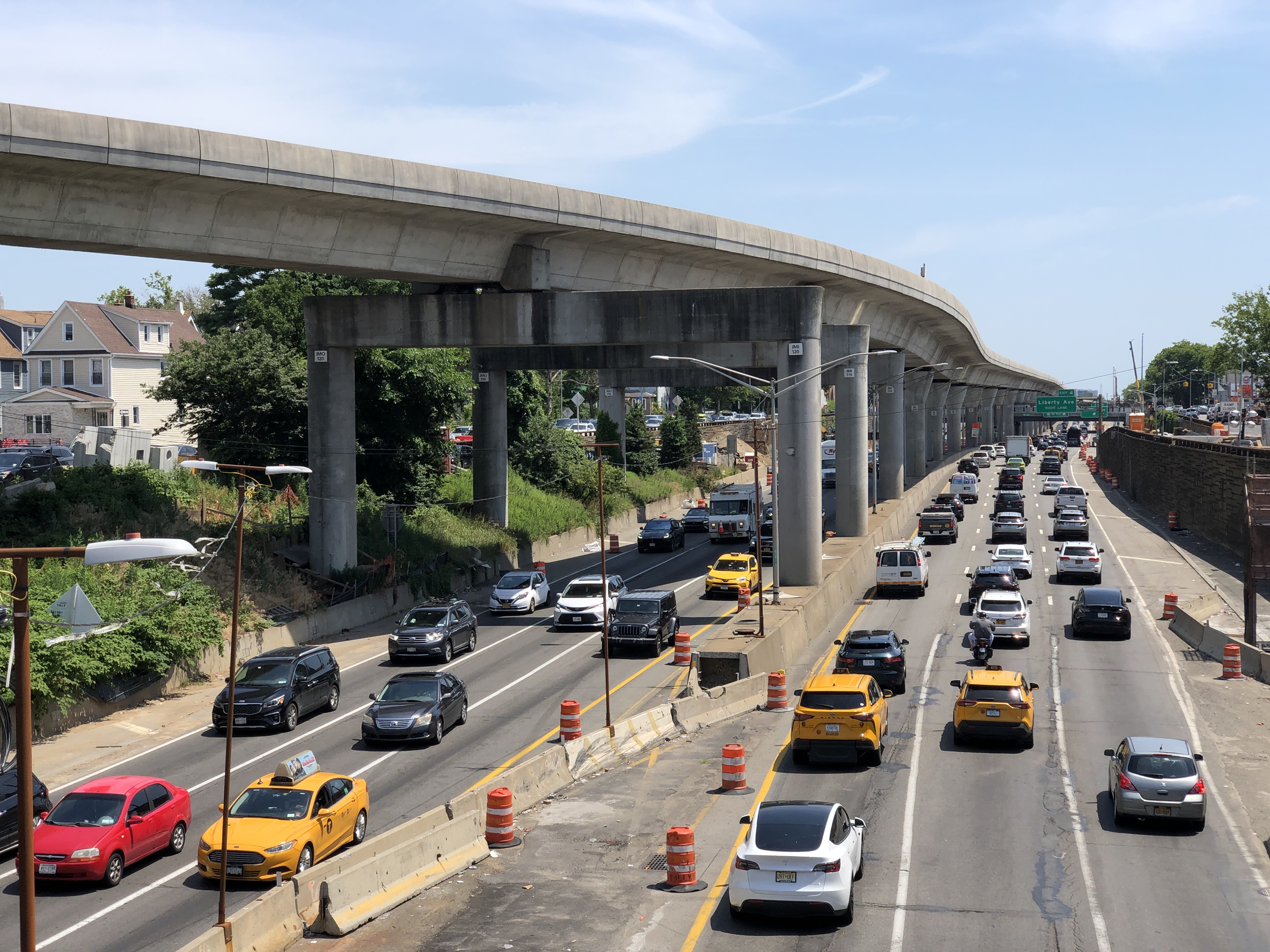
The Air Train JFK path above the Van Wyck Expressway

Queens is traversed by three trunk east–west highways. The Long Island Expressway (Interstate 495) runs from the Queens Midtown Tunnel on the west through the borough to Nassau County on the east. The Grand Central Parkway, whose western terminus is the Triborough Bridge, extends east to the Queens/Nassau border, where the roadway continues as the Northern State Parkway. The Belt Parkway begins at the Gowanus Expressway in Brooklyn, and extends east into Queens, past Aqueduct Racetrack and JFK Airport. On its eastern end at the Queens/Nassau border, it splits into the Southern State Parkway which continues east, and the Cross Island Parkway which turns north.

There are also several major north–south highways in Queens, including the Brooklyn-Queens Expressway (Interstate 278), the Van Wyck Expressway (Interstate 678), the Clearview Expressway (Interstate 295), and the Cross Island Parkway.

Queens has six state highways that run west–east largely on surface roads. From north to south, they are New York State Route 25A (Northern Boulevard), New York State Route 25B (Hillside Avenue), New York State Route 25 (Queens Boulevard, Hillside Avenue, and Braddock Avenue), New York State Route 24 (Hempstead Avenue), and New York State Route 27 (Conduit Avenue). The only state highway that primarily uses an expressway is New York State Route 878, which uses the Nassau Expressway in southern Queens.

==== Streets ====
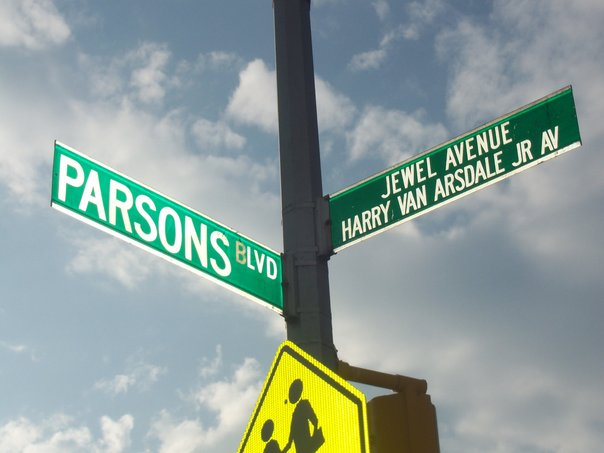
Cross-street signs for a single-named boulevard and a co-named avenue in Queens

The streets of Queens are laid out in a semi-grid system, with a numerical system of street names (similar to Manhattan and the Bronx). Nearly all roadways oriented north–south are "Streets", while east–west roadways are "Avenues", beginning with the number 1 in the west for Streets and the north for Avenues. In some parts of the borough, several consecutive streets may share numbers (for instance, 72nd Street followed by 72nd Place and 72nd Lane, or 52nd Avenue followed by 52nd Road, 52nd Drive, and 52nd Court), often confusing non-residents. Also, incongruous alignments of street grids, unusual street paths due to geography, or other circumstances often lead to the skipping of numbers (for instance, on Ditmars Boulevard, 70th Street is followed by Hazen Street which is followed by 49th Street). Numbered roads tend to be residential, although numbered commercial streets are not rare. A fair number of streets that were country roads in the 18th and 19th centuries (especially major thoroughfares such as Northern Boulevard, Queens Boulevard, Hillside Avenue, and Jamaica Avenue) carry names rather than numbers, typically though not uniformly called "Boulevards" or "Parkways".

Queens house numbering was designed to provide convenience in locating the address itself; the first half of a number in a Queens address refers to the nearest cross street, the second half refers to the house or lot number from where the street begins from that cross street, followed by the name of the street itself. For example, to find an address in Queens, 14-01 120th Street, one could ascertain from the address structure itself that the listed address is at the intersection of 14th Avenue and 120th Street and that the address must be closest to 14th Avenue rather than 15th Avenue, as it is the first lot on the block. This pattern does not stop when a street is named, assuming that there is an existing numbered cross-street. For example, Queens College is situated at 65–30 Kissena Boulevard, and is so named because the cross-street closest to the entrance is 65th Avenue.

Many of the village street grids of Queens had only worded names, some were numbered according to local numbering schemes, and some had a mix of words and numbers. In the early 1920s, a "Philadelphia Plan" was instituted to overlay one numbered system upon the whole borough. The Topographical Bureau, Borough of Queens, worked out the details. Subway stations were only partly renamed, and some, including those along the IRT Flushing Line (7 and <7> trains), now share dual names after the original street names. In 2012, some numbered streets in the Douglaston Hill Historic District were renamed to their original names, with 43rd Avenue becoming Pine Street.

The Rockaway Peninsula does not follow the same system as the rest of the borough and has its own numbering system. Streets are numbered in ascending order heading west from near the Nassau County border, and are prefixed with the word "Beach". Streets at the easternmost end, however, are nearly all named. Bayswater, which is on Jamaica Bay, has its numbered streets prefixed with the word "Bay" rather than "Beach". Another deviation from the norm is Broad Channel; it maintains the north–south numbering progression but uses only the suffix "Road", as well as the prefixes "West" and "East", depending on location relative to Cross Bay Boulevard, the neighborhood's major through street. Broad Channel's streets were a continuation of the mainland Queens grid in the 1950s; formerly the highest-numbered avenue in Queens was 208th Avenue rather than today's 165th Avenue in Howard Beach & Hamilton Beach. The other exception is the neighborhood of Ridgewood, which for the most part shares a grid and house numbering system with the Brooklyn neighborhood of Bushwick. The grid runs east–west from the LIRR Bay Ridge Branch right-of-way to Flushing Avenue; and north–south from Forest Avenue in Ridgewood to Bushwick Avenue in Brooklyn before adjusting to meet up with the Bedford-Stuyvesant grid at Broadway. All streets on the grid have names.

==== Bridges and tunnels ====
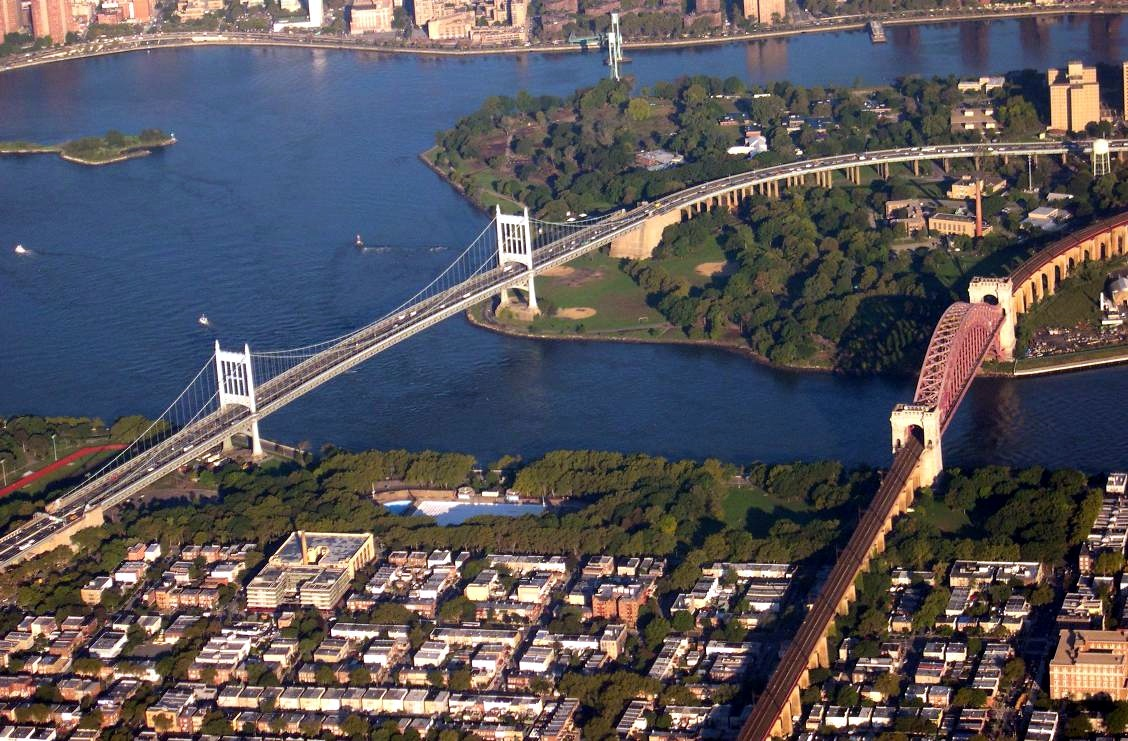
The Triborough Bridge connects Queens with Manhattan and The Bronx.

Queens is connected to the Bronx by the Bronx–Whitestone Bridge, the Throgs Neck Bridge, the Triborough Bridge (also known as the Robert F. Kennedy Bridge), and the Hell Gate Bridge. Queens is connected to Manhattan Island by the Triborough Bridge, the Queensboro Bridge, and the Queens–Midtown Tunnel, as well as to Roosevelt Island by the Roosevelt Island Bridge.

While most of the Queens/Brooklyn border is on land, the Kosciuszko Bridge crosses the Newtown Creek connecting Maspeth to Greenpoint, Brooklyn. The Pulaski Bridge connects McGuinness Boulevard in Greenpoint to 11th Street, Jackson Avenue, and Hunters Point Avenue in Long Island City. The J. J. Byrne Memorial Bridge (a.k.a. Greenpoint Avenue Bridge) connects the sections of Greenpoint Avenue in Greenpoint and Long Island City. A lesser bridge connects Grand Avenue in Queens to Grand Street in Brooklyn.

The Cross Bay Veterans Memorial Bridge, built in 1939, traverses Jamaica Bay to connect the Rockaway Peninsula to Broad Channel and the rest of Queens. Constructed in 1937, the Marine Parkway–Gil Hodges Memorial Bridge links Flatbush Avenue, Brooklyn's longest thoroughfare, with Jacob Riis Park and the western end of the Peninsula. Both crossings were built and continue to be operated by what is now known as MTA Bridges and Tunnels. The IND Rockaway Line parallels the Cross Bay, has a mid-bay station at Broad Channel which is just a short walk from the Jamaica Bay Wildlife Refuge, now part of Gateway National Recreation Area and a major stop on the Atlantic Flyway.

== Notable people ==
Many public figures have grown up or lived in Queens. Donald Trump, a businessman who became the 45th and later 47th and current President of the United States, was born in Jamaica Hospital Medical Center and raised at 81-15 Wareham Place in Jamaica Estates, later moving to Midland Parkway. He was preceded in the White House by former First Lady Nancy Reagan, who lived in Flushing as a child.

Harold R. Story, a US Army major general, commanded the 42nd Infantry Division in the 1970s. Theodore Roosevelt, the 26th President, lived at Sagamore Hill in Oyster Bay from the mid-1880s until he died; the area was considered part of Queens until the formation of neighboring Nassau County in 1899.

Director and Musicians born or raised in the borough include:

- 50 Cent
- Melanie Martinez
- Action Bronson
- Chinx
- Cyndi Lauper
- d4vd
- Ja Rule
- Kelly Price
- Lil Tecca
- LL Cool J
- Lloyd Banks
- MC Serch
- Mobb Deep
- N.O.R.E.
- Nadia Ali,
- Bill D'Elia
- Nas
- Nicki Minaj
- Nina Sky
- Onyx
- Pepa of Salt-N-Pepa
- The Ramones
- Rich The Kid
- Run–D.M.C.
- Sylvain Sylvain, Johnny Thunders and Billy Murcia of the New York Dolls
- Tony Bennett,
- Tony Yayo
- A Tribe Called Quest

Jazz greats Louis Armstrong and Norman Mapp both resided in Corona, as well as folk rock duo Simon & Garfunkel and guitarists Scott Ian and Johnny Ramone. K-pop rapper Mark Lee from the boy group NCT grew up in Queens before moving to Canada. Madonna, from 1979 to 1980, lived in Corona as a member of the band Breakfast Club.

Actors and actresses such as Adrien Brody, Zoe Saldaña, Lucy Liu, John Leguizamo, Susan Sarandon, and Idina Menzel were born or raised in Queens. Actress Mae West also lived in Queens. Writers from Queens include John Guare (The House of Blue Leaves) and Laura Z. Hobson (Gentleman's Agreement). Mafia boss John Gotti lived in Queens for many years. Richard Feynman, a scientist who was awarded the Nobel Prize in Physics, was born in Queens and grew up in Far Rockaway. Lee "Q" O'Denat, founder of WorldStarHipHop was from Hollis.

Queens has also been home to athletes such as:

- Professional basketball players Rafer Alston, Kareem Abdul-Jabbar, (Note: Kareem Abdul-Jabbar was born Lew Alcindor (né Ferdinand Lewis Alcindor Jr.).) Metta World Peace, (Note: Born Ron Artest.) Emily Engstler, and Celeste Taylor
- Olympic athletes Bob Beamon and Dalilah Muhammad
- Tennis player John McEnroe was born in Douglaston. Hall of Fame baseball pitcher Whitey Ford grew up in Astoria. Journalist Marie Colvin was a native of Queens. Joe Macken who handmade a miniature model replica of New York City was a native of Queens.

== In popular culture ==
Queens has also served as a setting for various fictional characters. Notably, the Marvel Comics characters Peter Parker / Spider-Man and Frank Castle/The Punisher from Marvel Comics are both from Queens, with the former being from Forest Hills and the latter being from Astoria. and Archie Bunker of All in the Family, who lived at the fictional 704 Hauser Street in Astoria. The popular sitcom The King of Queens is set in the titular borough, with the main characters living in a house in Rego Park. The movie Somewhere in Queens, starring Queens native Ray Romano, is also set in the title borough.

== The Cemetery Belt ==
Several large cemeteries in Queens – St. Michaels, Luthern, Calvary, Cypress Hill, Mt. Olivet and Mt. Zion – together with several in Brooklyn are collectively known as The Cemetery Belt. There are about five million burials in the borough and Calvary, with about 3 million burials, has the largest number of interments of any cemetery in the United States.

== See also ==
- List of tallest buildings in Queens
- National Register of Historic Places listings in Queens County, New York
- Queens directories
