= Education in New York City =

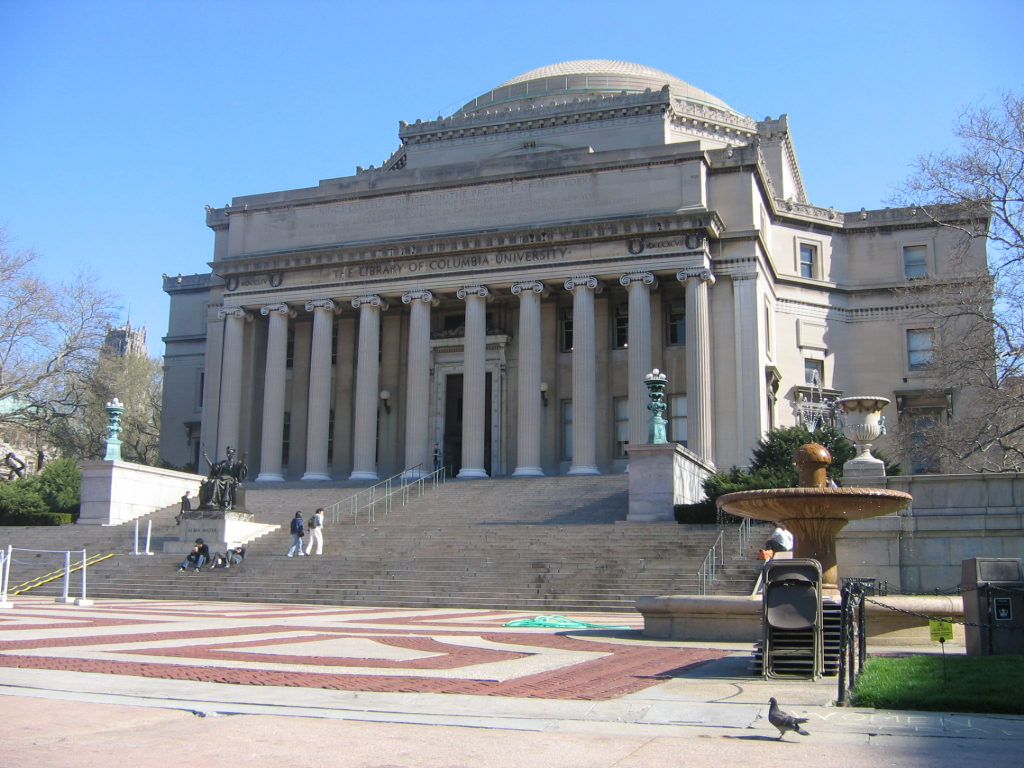
Columbia University's Low Memorial Library

Education in New York City is provided by a vast number of public and private institutions. New York City has the largest educational system of any city in the world. The city's educational infrastructure spans primary education, secondary education, higher education, and research. New York City is home to some of the most important libraries, universities, and research centers in the world. In 2006, New York had the most post-graduate life sciences degrees awarded annually in the United States, 40,000 licensed physicians, and 127 Nobel laureates with roots in local institutions. The city receives the second-highest amount of annual funding from the National Institutes of Health among all U.S. cities. It also struggles with disparity in its public school system, with some of the best-performing public schools in the United States as well as some of the worst-performing. Under Mayor Michael Bloomberg, the city embarked on a major school reform effort.

New York City has many nationally important independent universities and colleges, such as Barnard College, Columbia University, Cooper Union, Cornell Tech, Fordham University, Long Island University, Manhattan University, New York Institute of Technology, New York University, Pace University, Pratt Institute, St. John's University, The New School, Vaughn College of Aeronautics and Technology, and Yeshiva University. The city has dozens of other private colleges and universities, including many religious and special-purpose institutions, such as St. Francis College, The Juilliard School and The School of Visual Arts.

New York City's public school system, operated by the New York City Department of Education, is the largest in the world. More than 1.1 million students are taught in more than 1,700 public schools with a budget of nearly $25 billion. It contains several selective specialized schools, such as Stuyvesant High School, The Bronx High School of Science, and Brooklyn Technical High School. There are several charter schools that operate in the city, such as Success Academy Charter Schools and Public Prep. There are also approximately 900 additional privately run secular and religious schools in the city.

The New York Public Library, which has the largest collection of any public library system in the country, serves Manhattan, the Bronx, and Staten Island. It has several research libraries including the Main Branch and the Schomburg Center for Research in Black Culture. Queens is served by the Queens Borough Public Library, the nation's second largest public library system, while Brooklyn Public Library serves Brooklyn.

New York City is also home to hundreds of cultural institutions and historic sites, many of which are internationally known. It is widely regarded a center of scientific research, particularly in medicine and the life sciences. The city has 15 nationally leading academic medical research institutions and medical centers.

== Higher education ==
There are about 594,000 university students in New York City attending around 110 universities and colleges. New York State is the nation's largest importer of college students; statistics show that among freshmen who leave their home states to attend college, more come to New York State than any other state, including California. Enrollment in New York State is led by New York City, which is home to more university students than any other city in the United States. As of 2006, students in the state had more post-graduate life sciences degrees awarded annually than any other state. There were 40,000 licensed physicians as well as 127 Nobel laureates with roots in local institutions. The city gets more annual funding from National Institutes of Health than all other U.S. cities except Boston. Additionally, the higher education sector is also a vital contributor to the city's economy, employing 110,000 people in 2007 and accounting for nearly 2.5 percent of overall employment in New York.

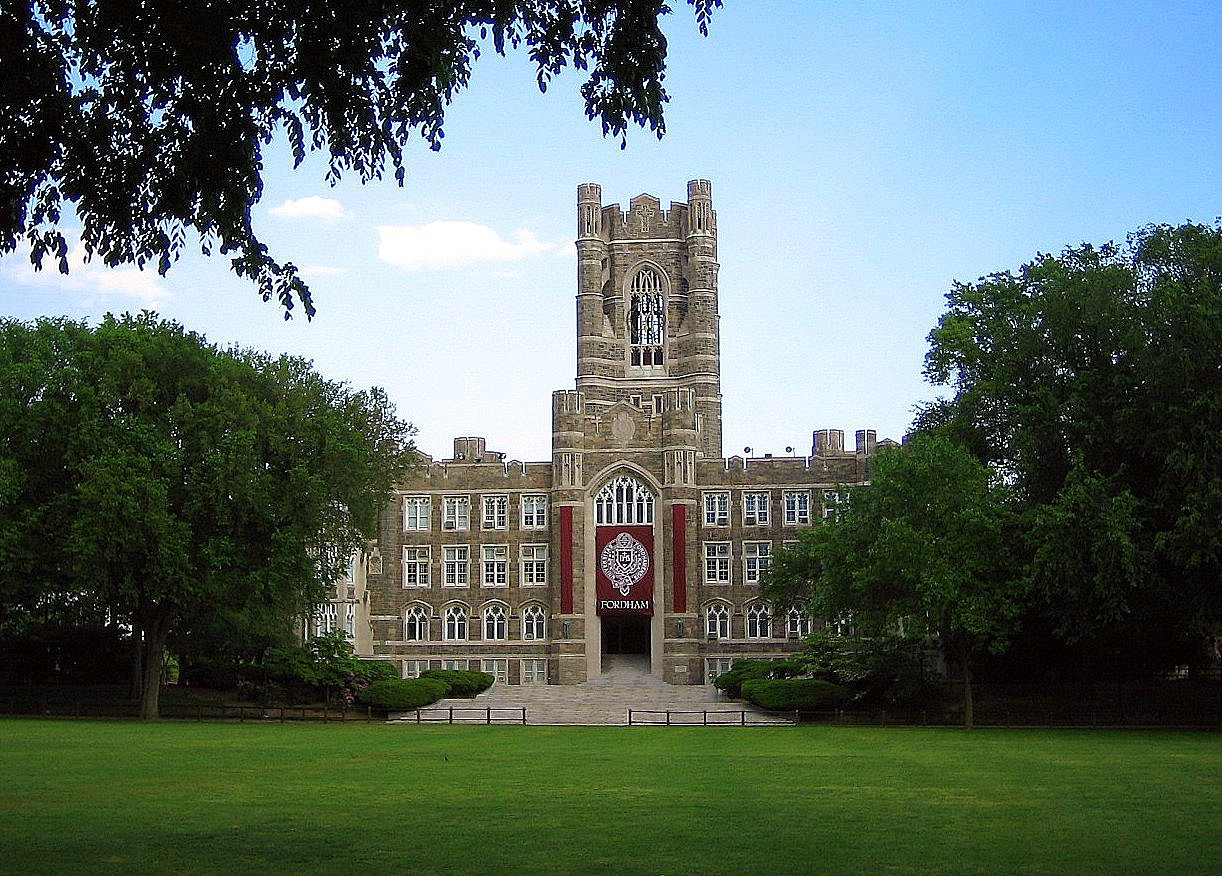
Fordham University's Keating Hall in the Bronx

Public higher education is provided by the many campuses of the City University of New York (CUNY) and the State University of New York (SUNY). CUNY is built around the City College of New York, whose own history dates back to the formation of the Free Academy in 1847. Much of CUNY's student body, which represent 197 countries, consists of new immigrants to New York City. CUNY has campuses in all of the five boroughs, with 11 four-year colleges, 7 two-year colleges, a law school, a graduate school, a medical school, an honors college, a public health school, professional studies school, and a journalism school. A third of college graduates in New York City are CUNY graduates, with the institution enrolling about half of all college students in New York City. The City University's alumni include Jonas Salk, Colin Powell, Paul Simon and Art Garfunkel.

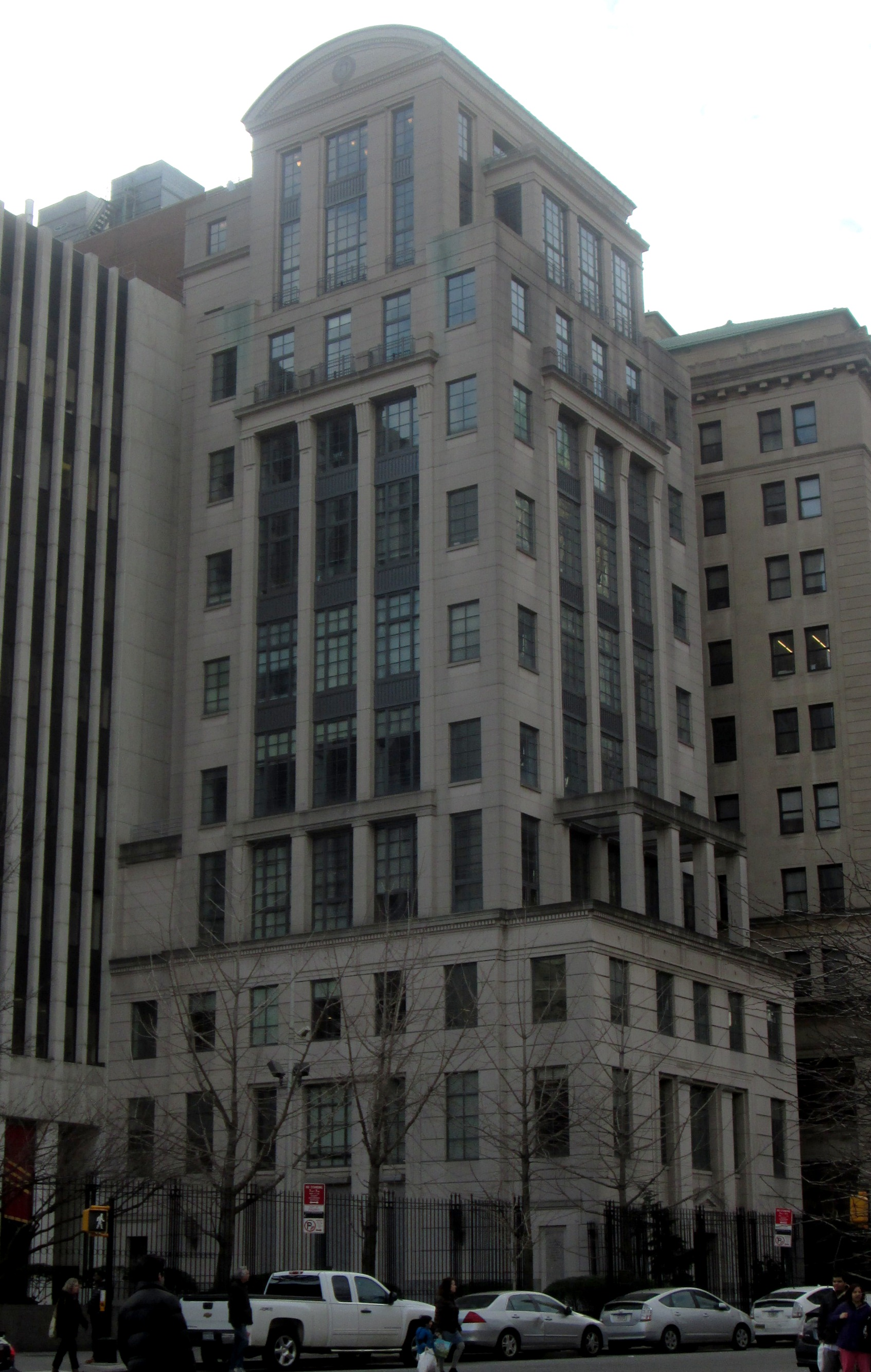
Brooklyn Law School. The 1994 new classical Fell Hall tower by NYC architect Robert A. M. Stern pictured.

Columbia University, an Ivy League university founded in 1754 and currently located in Morningside Heights, Manhattan, is the fifth oldest institution of higher learning in the United States. Barnard College is an independent women's college, one of the original Seven Sisters, affiliated with Columbia. Through a reciprocal agreement, Barnard and Columbia students share classes, housing, and extracurricular activities, and Barnard graduates receive the degree of the university.

Cornell University, New York's other Ivy League university, also maintains a substantial presence in Manhattan. While Cornell's main campus is located in Ithaca, New York, the university's technology campus, Cornell Tech, opened in 2017 on Roosevelt Island. Weill Cornell Medicine, Cornell University's medical school, is located on the Upper East Side of Manhattan.

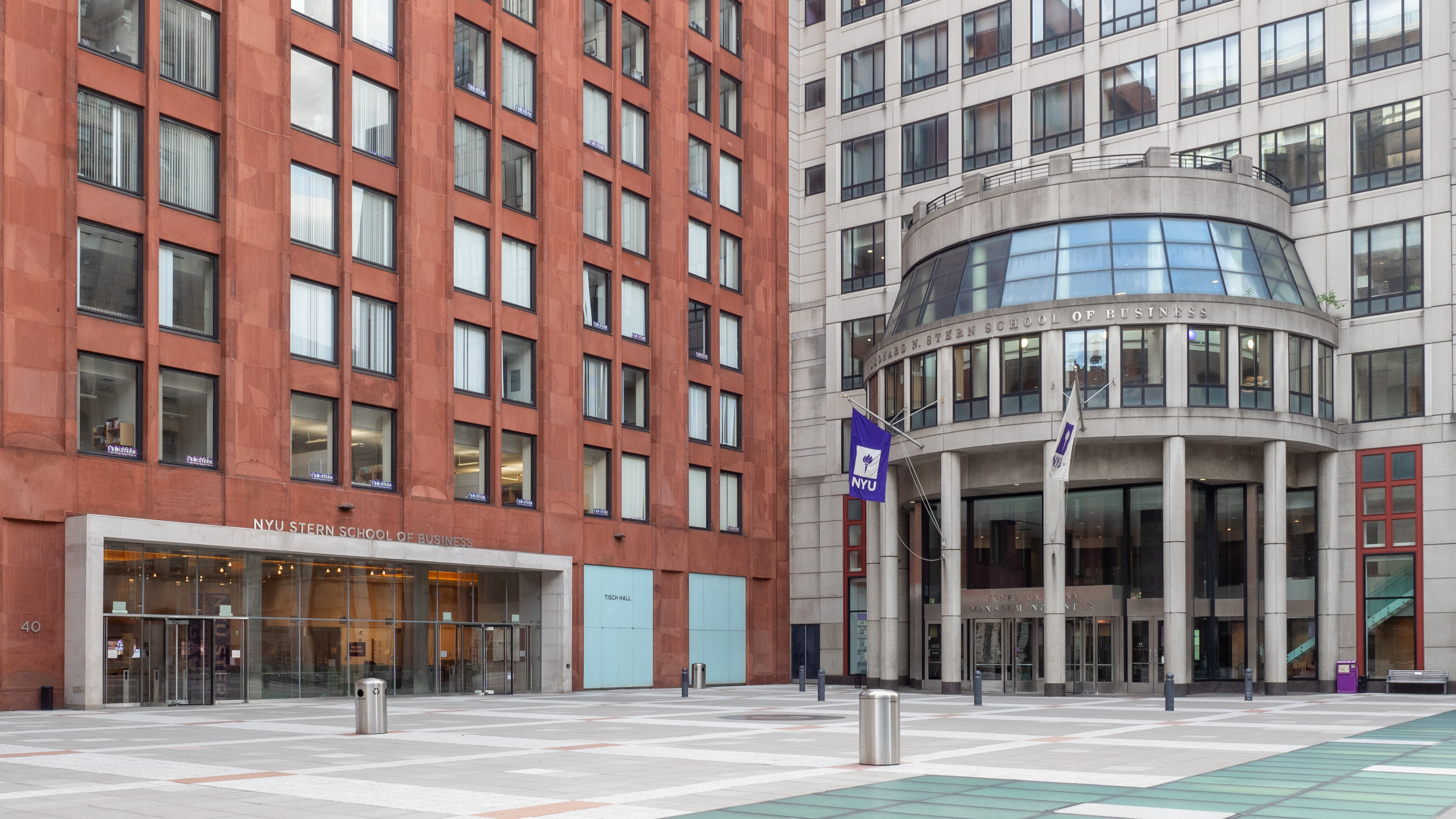
The Stern School of Business is New York University's business school.

New York University (NYU) is a private, nonsectarian research university based in New York City. NYU's main campus is situated in Greenwich Village, Manhattan, but it has campus buildings around the city and campuses and global "academic centers" worldwide. Founded in 1831, NYU is one of the largest private, nonprofit institutions of higher education in the United States.

The New York Institute of Technology, or New York Tech, is a private, not-for-profit, accredited, doctoral and research university that was founded in 1955. The university has several locations, including the main campuses in Long Island and New York City, and other campuses in Jonesboro, Arkansas, and Vancouver, Canada.

The New School, located mostly in Greenwich Village, is a private multidisciplinary university housing eight specialized colleges, including the internationally recognized art school, Parsons The New School for Design. Founded in 1919 as The New School for Social Research, the university established itself as a modern free school where adult students could "seek an unbiased understanding of the existing order, its genesis, growth and present working".

Cooper Union for the Advancement of Science and Art, located in Manhattan's Cooper Square, was founded in 1859 by Peter Cooper to provide education in engineering, architecture, and the fine arts. The Cooper Union was made tuition-free so that the school would be "open and free to all", and that all qualifying students could get an education "equal to the best technology schools established" at the time. independent of their race, religion, sex, wealth or social status. For 155 years until 2014, Cooper Union admitted students based on merit alone and provided each with a full-tuition scholarship.

Three of the United States' leading Roman Catholic colleges are in New York City. The Jesuit-associated Fordham University, with campuses in Manhattan and the Bronx, was the first Catholic university in the Northeast, founded in 1841. St. John's University was founded by the Vincentian Fathers in 1870 and now has campuses in Queens, Manhattan, and Staten Island, with over 20,000 graduate and undergraduate students. It is also a founding member of the Division I Big East Conference. Manhattan University, founded in 1853 by the De La Salle Brothers, is located in the Bronx's Riverdale neighborhood and offers students a liberal arts education, Division I athletics, and graduate degree options in Business, Education, and Engineering.

Other notable universities include Yeshiva University in Washington Heights, a Jewish university rooted in America's oldest Yeshiva, founded in 1886. One of the nation's most prestigious conservatories, The Juilliard School, is located on the Upper West Side. New York Law School, a private law school in lower Manhattan, is one of the oldest independent law schools in the United States. The New York Academy of Sciences is one of the oldest scientific societies in the United States, comprising some 20,000 scientists of all disciplines from 150 countries.

== Primary and secondary education ==
=== Public schools ===
The New York City public school system is the largest in the United States. More than 1.1 million students are taught in more than 1,700 public schools with a budget of nearly $25 billion. The public school system is managed by the New York City Department of Education. It includes Empowerment Schools.

According to Census Data, NYC spent $19,076 each year per student in 2013, more than any other state compared to the national average of $10,560. Per student spending has continued to increase.

The New York City Department of Education is the largest public school system in the United States.

Among New York City public high schools are nine selective specialized high schools: Brooklyn Latin School, Bronx High School of Science, Brooklyn Technical High School, Fiorello H. LaGuardia High School, the High School of American Studies at Lehman College, the High School for Math, Science and Engineering at City College, Queens High School for the Sciences, Stuyvesant High School, and Staten Island Technical High School. The Specialized High Schools Admissions Test (SHSAT) examination is required for admission to all the schools except LaGuardia, which requires an audition or portfolio for admission. Other selective high schools include Hunter College High School, a public school run by CUNY.

A small portion of land between the town of Pelham and Pelham Bay Park, with a total of 35 houses, is a part of the Bronx, but is cut off from the rest of the borough due to the way the county boundaries were established. Since 1948, the New York City government has paid for the residents' children to attend Pelham Union Free School District schools, since that is cheaper than sending school buses to take the students to New York City schools.

==== School funding lawsuit ====
A constitutional challenge to the New York State school funding system was filed in 1993 by the Campaign for Fiscal Equity. The lawsuit, Campaign for Fiscal Equity, Inc. (CFE) v. State of New York (also known as CFE v. State of New York), claims that the state's school finance system under-funds New York City public schools and denies its students their constitutional right to a sound basic education.

The Court of Appeals, New York's highest court, ruled in 1996 that the New York State constitution requires that the state offer all children the opportunity for a "sound basic education". In 2001, State Supreme Court Justice Leland DeGrasse found that the current state school funding system was unconstitutional. Governor George Pataki appealed the decision, which was overturned in 2002 by the Appellate Division. CFE appealed to the New York Court of Appeals, which again found in favor of CFE in 2003. The Court of Appeals gave the State of New York until July 30, 2004 to comply with its order.

The state failed to meet this deadline, however, and the court appointed three referees who were given until November 30, 2004 to submit a compliance plan to Justice Leland DeGrasse of the State Supreme Court. Justice DeGrasse agreed with the referees' recommendations and in 2005 ruled that New York City schools need nearly $15 billion to provide students with their constitutional right to the opportunity to receive a sound basic education.

Governor Pataki appealed again to the Appellate Division. In 2006, however, the Appellate Division ordered the State Legislature to consider a plan to direct between $4.7 billion and $5.63 billion to New York City schools and upheld an earlier ruling to provide about $9.2 billion in capital funds to the school system over five years. New York City's public secondary schools include: Bard High School Early College, Bronx High School of Science, Brooklyn Technical High School, Hunter College High School, LaGuardia High School, Staten Island Technical High School, Stuyvesant High School, and Townsend Harris High School. The city is home to the largest Roman Catholic high school in the U.S., St. Francis Preparatory School in Fresh Meadows, Queens, and the only official Italian-American school in the country, La Scuola d'Italia Guglielmo Marconi on the Upper East Side of Manhattan.

=== Charter schools ===
Several charter schools operate in the city, including Success Academy Charter Schools and Public Prep.

=== Private schools ===
There are approximately 900 additional privately run secular and religious schools in the city, some of which are among the top independent schools in the nation. The New York City Department of Education pays $70 million annually to the private school sector. The Brearley School, Dalton School, Spence School, Browning School, Chapin School, Friends Seminary, Nightingale-Bamford School, Regis High School, Loyola School, LREI, Hewitt School, and Convent of the Sacred Heart are all on the Upper East Side of Manhattan. The Collegiate School, The Dwight School, Columbia Grammar & Preparatory School, and Trinity School are located on the Upper West Side of Manhattan. There are several private schools in Riverdale, Bronx, including the Horace Mann School, Ethical Culture Fieldston School, and Riverdale Country School. Additionally, Packer Collegiate Institute, Brooklyn Friends School, and Saint Ann's School are located in Brooklyn Heights, and Gantry View School (formerly Queens Paideia School) is located in Long Island City in Queens.

The Japanese School of New York, a Japanese international school, was formerly located in Queens but is now in Greenwich, Connecticut.

=== Parochial schools ===
There are many parochial schools, serving elementary and secondary levels of students. The main denominations or religions operating these institutions are Roman Catholic, Protestant, Jewish, and Islamic.

==== Roman Catholic schools ====
The Roman Catholic Archdiocese of New York administers institutions in Manhattan, Staten Island, and Bronx boroughs. The Roman Catholic Diocese of Brooklyn administers such schools in Brooklyn and Queens.

Examples of Roman Catholic institutions include Convent of the Sacred Heart in Manhattan and St. Francis Preparatory School in Queens, the largest Catholic high school in the U.S. Also, The Mary Louis Academy, an all-girls Roman Catholic school located in Jamaica Estates, Queens, The Loyola School on the Upper East Side of Manhattan, a co-ed Jesuit school, Fordham Preparatory School, an all-boys Jesuit school in the Bronx, Xavier High School, an all-boys Jesuit school in Manhattan, and several others.

==== Islamic schools ====
There are several Islamic schools in New York City, including Darul Uloom New York, Al-Noor School, and others. Darul Uloom New York is an affiliate of Darul Uloom Haqqania in Pakistan.

==== Jewish schools ====
Jewish schools are known as day schools or yeshivas. There are over 300 Jewish schools in NYC.

Yeshivah of Flatbush in Brooklyn, is an example of a Modern Orthodox Jewish school. The Satmar Jewish community of Brooklyn operates its own network of schools, which is the fourth largest school system in New York state. In 2013 there were over 151,000 Jewish students of all ages attending day schools and yeshivas in New York State, concentrated in and around New York City.

== Weekend education programs ==
The Japanese Weekend School of New York (JWSNY), a Japanese weekend supplementary school system headquartered in New Rochelle, New York, holds classes for Japanese expatriates and Japanese Americans in the Rufus King School in Fresh Meadows, Queens.

== Libraries ==
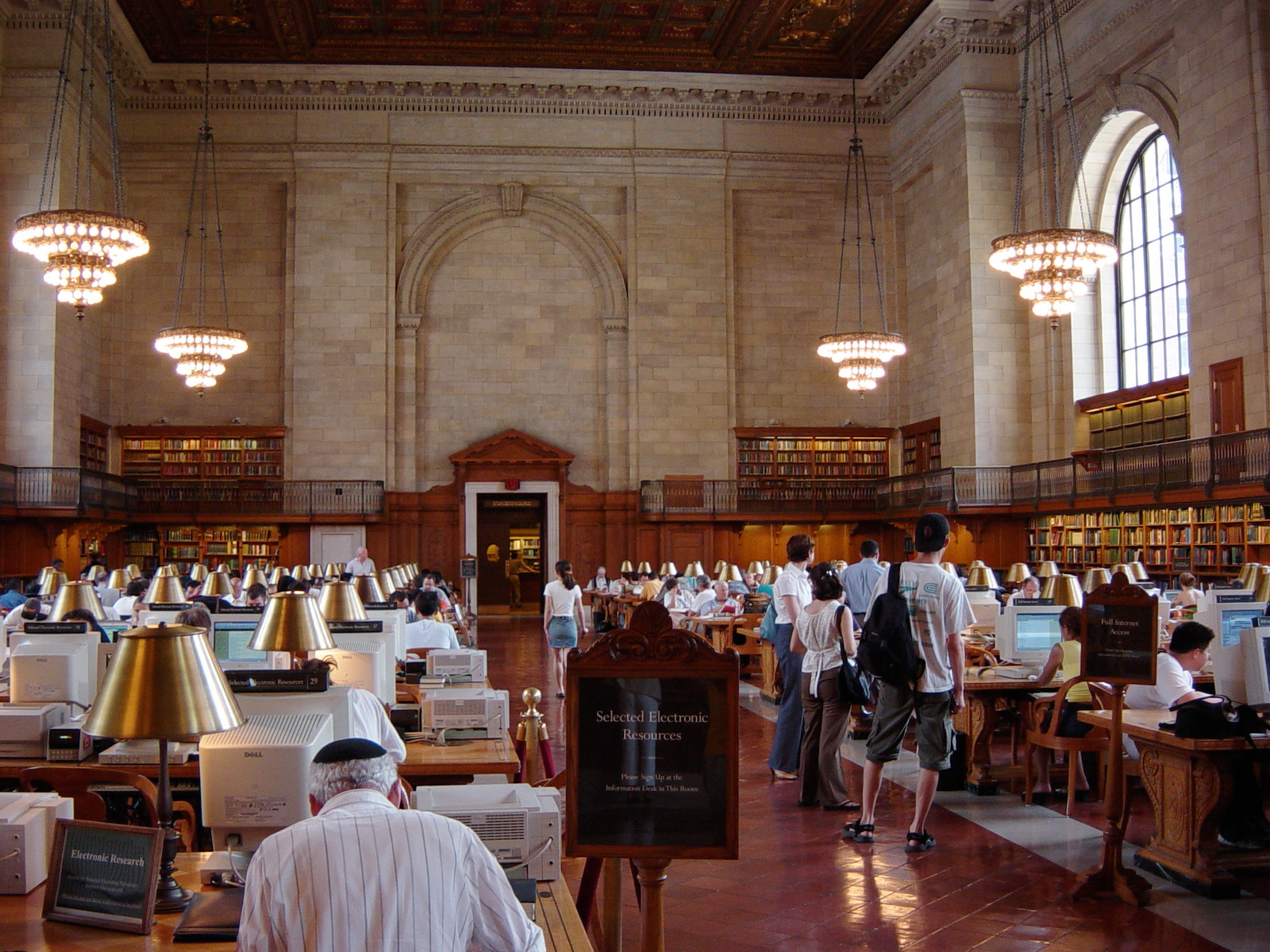
Rose Reading Room at the New York Public Library Main Branch in Manhattan (full panoramic photo)

New York City has three public library systems, the New York Public Library, serving Manhattan, the Bronx, and Staten Island; the Brooklyn Public Library, serving Brooklyn; and the Queens Public Library, serving Queens. The New York Public Library comprises simultaneously a set of scholarly research collections and a network of community libraries and is the busiest public library system in the world. Over 15.5 million patrons checked out books, periodicals, and other materials from the library's 82 branches in the 2004–2005 fiscal year. The library has four major research centers. The largest is the Library for the Humanities, which ranks in importance with the Library of Congress, the British Library, and the Bibliothèque nationale de France. It has 39 million items in its collection.

The Brooklyn Public Library is the fourth-largest library system in the country, serving more than two million people each year. The Central Library is its main reference center, with an additional 58 branches. Foreign language collections in 70 different languages, from Arabic to Creole to Vietnamese, are tailored to the neighborhoods they serve.

The Queens Library is the top library system in the United States by circulation, having loaned 20.2 million items in the 2006 fiscal year. The Queens Library serves the city's most diverse borough with a full range of services and programs for adults and children at the central reference library on Merrick Boulevard in Jamaica, Queens and at its 62 branches. Collections include books, periodicals, compact discs and videos. All branches have a computerized catalogue of the library's holdings, as well as access to the Internet. Lectures, performances and special events are presented by neighborhood branches.

There are several other important libraries in the city. Among them is the Morgan Library, originally the private library of J. P. Morgan and made a public institution by his son, John Pierpont Morgan. It is now a research library with an important collection, including material from ancient Egypt, Émile Zola, William Blake's original drawings for his edition of the Book of Job; a Percy Bysshe Shelley notebook; originals of poems by Robert Burns; a Charles Dickens manuscript of A Christmas Carol; 30 shelves of Bibles; a journal by Henry David Thoreau; Mozart's Haffner Symphony in D Major; and manuscripts for George Sand, William Makepeace Thackeray, Lord Byron, Charlotte Brontë and nine of Sir Walter Scott's novels, including Ivanhoe. The library is currently undergoing a significant expansion designed by Renzo Piano.

== Museums ==
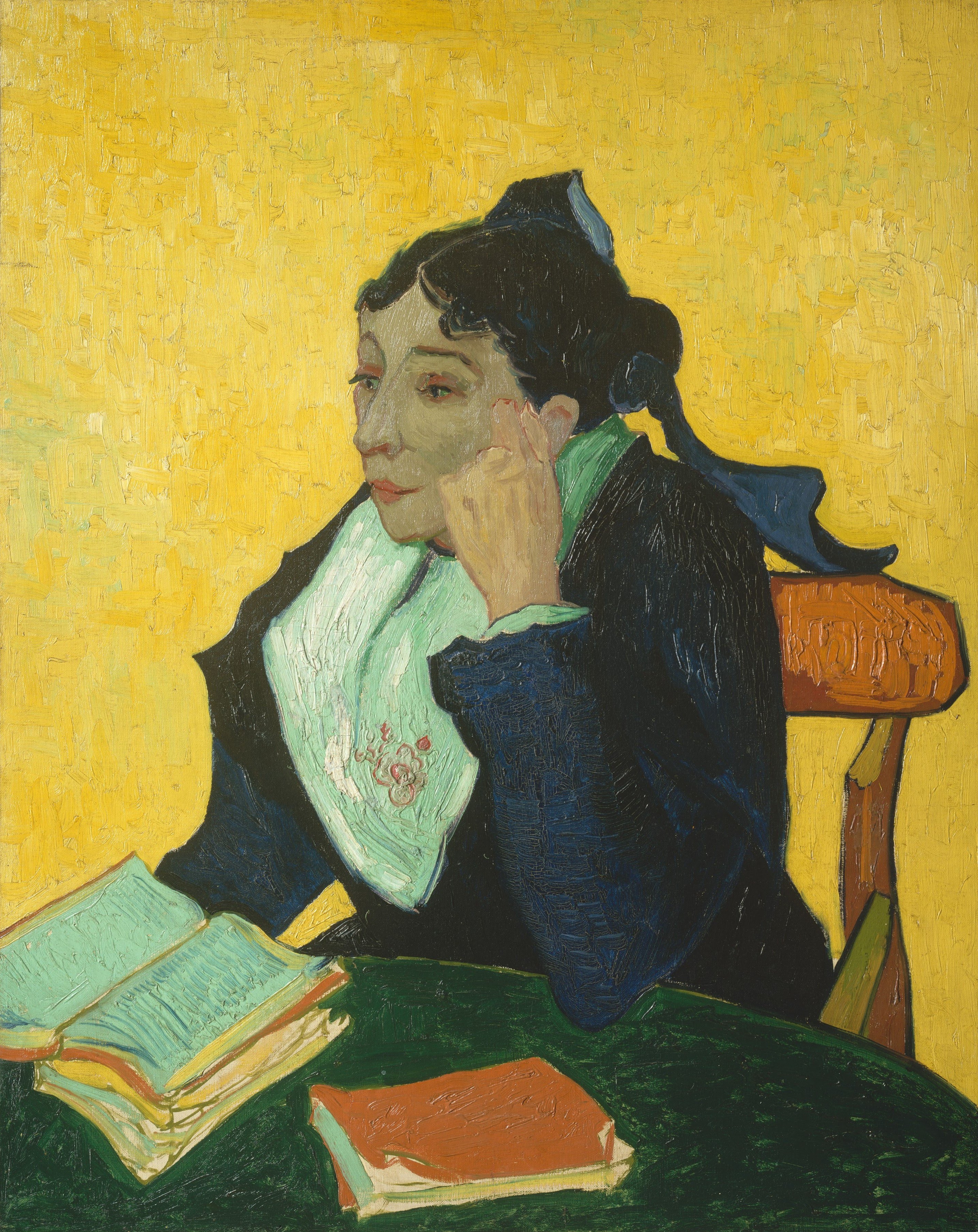
L'Arlésienne (Porträt der Mme Ginoux), by Vincent van Gogh, at the Metropolitan Museum of Art

New York City is home to hundreds of cultural institutions and historic sites, many of which are internationally known.

The Metropolitan Museum of Art is one of the world's largest art museums, located on the eastern edge of Central Park. It also comprises a building complex known as The Cloisters in Fort Tryon Park at the north end of Manhattan overlooking the Hudson River which features medieval art. The Museum of Modern Art (MoMA) is often considered a rival to the Metropolitan Museum of Art. The Brooklyn Museum is the second largest art museum in New York and one of the largest in the United States. The American Museum of Natural History, on Manhattan's Upper West Side, is one of the largest natural history museums in the world.

There are many smaller important galleries and art museums in the city. Among these is the Frick Collection, one of the preeminent small art museums in the United States, with a collection of old master paintings housed in 16 galleries within the former mansion of steel magnate Henry Clay Frick. The Jewish Museum of New York, created in 1904, has a collection 28,000 objects including paintings, sculpture, archaeological artifacts, and many other pieces important to the preservation of Jewish history and culture. El Museo del Barrio, founded in 1969 on Museum Mile in East Harlem, was a creation of the Nuyorican Movement and Civil Rights Movement. In Chelsea, Manhattan, the Rubin Museum of Art is a museum dedicated to the collection, display, and preservation of the art of the Himalayas and surrounding regions, especially that of Tibet.

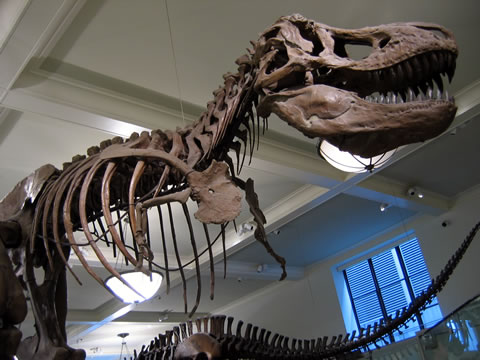
A dinosaur replica at the American Museum of Natural History

There are several botanical gardens in New York City. The New York Botanical Garden in the Bronx, with over one million living plants, was modeled after the Royal Botanic Gardens in London. The Brooklyn Botanic Garden, Queens Botanical Garden, and Staten Island Botanical Garden also exist within the city.

The city contains several children's museums as well. The Brooklyn Children's Museum is a general purpose museum in Crown Heights, Brooklyn. Founded in 1899, it was the first museum in the world to cater specifically to children. The museum is currently undergoing extensive renovation and expansion. The New York Hall of Science is a hands-on science and technology center with more than 400 exhibits exploring biology, chemistry, and physics. It is located in one of the few remaining structures of the 1964 New York World's Fair.

== Scientific research ==
New York is a center of scientific research, particularly in medicine and the life sciences. The city has 15 nationally leading academic medical research institutions and medical centers. These include Rockefeller University, Beth Israel Medical Center (closed, 2025) Columbia-Presbyterian Medical Center, Weill Cornell Medical College, Mount Sinai Medical Center (where Jonas Salk developed the vaccine for polio as an intern) and Mount Sinai School of Medicine, Memorial Sloan-Kettering Cancer Center, and the medical schools of New York University. In the Bronx, the Albert Einstein College of Medicine is a major academic center. Brooklyn also hosts one of the country's leading urban medical centers, SUNY Downstate Medical Center, an academic medical research institution and the oldest hospital-based medical school in the United States. Professor Raymond Vahan Damadian, a pioneer in magnetic resonance imaging research, was part of the faculty from 1967 to 1977 and built the first MRI machine, the Indomitable, there. The New York Structural Biology Center, in upper Manhattan, is a highly regarded federally funded medical research center with the largest and most advanced cluster of high-field research magnets in the United States. More than 50 bioscience companies and two biotech incubators are located in the city, with as many as 30 companies spun out of local research institutions each year.

The Goddard Institute for Space Studies (GISS) is a component laboratory of NASA's Goddard Space Flight Center Earth-Sun Exploration Division and a unit of The Earth Institute at Columbia University. Current research at GISS emphasizes a broad study of global climate change. It also conducts basic research in space sciences in support of Goddard programs.

Rockefeller University, located on the Upper East Side of Manhattan, is a world-renowned center for research and graduate education in the biomedical sciences, chemistry, and physics. Founded by John D. Rockefeller in 1901, the university has been the site of many important scientific breakthroughs. Rockefeller scientists established that DNA is the chemical basis of heredity, discovered blood groups, showed that viruses can cause cancer, founded the modern field of cell biology, worked out the structure of antibodies, developed methadone maintenance for people addicted to heroin, devised the AIDS "cocktail" drug therapy, and identified the weight-regulating hormone leptin. Twenty-three Nobel Prize winners have been associated with the university, an amazing figure considering that Rockefeller University houses a relatively small amount of labs.

The Pfizer Plant Research Laboratory in The Bronx, built with funding from the National Oceanic and Atmospheric Administration, New York State and New York City, and named for its largest private donor, is a major new research institution at the New York Botanical Garden opened in 2006. The laboratory is a pure research institution, with projects more diverse than research in universities and pharmaceutical companies. The laboratory's research emphasis is on plant genomics, the study of how genes function in plant development. One question scientists hope to answer is Darwin's "abominable mystery"; when, where, and why flowering plants emerged. The laboratory's research also furthers the discipline of molecular systematics, the study of DNA as evidence that can reveal the evolutionary history and relationships of plant species. Staff scientists also study plant use in immigrant communities in New York City and the genetic mechanisms by which neurotoxins are produced in some plants, work that may be related to nerve disease in humans. A staff of 200 trains 42 doctoral students at a time from all over the world; since the 1890s scientists from the New York Botanical Garden have mounted about 2,000 exploratory missions across the planet to collect plants in the wild. At the plant chemistry laboratory chemical compounds from plants are extracted to create a library of the chemistry of the world's plants and stored in a 768-square-foot (71.3 m^{2}) DNA storage room with 20 freezers that store millions of specimens, including rare, endangered or extinct species. To protect them during winter power outages, there is a backup 300-kilowatt electric generator.

== See also ==
- Education in Harlem
- Free University of New York – Social enterprise
