= High School of American Studies =

Specialized high school in New York City

High School of American Studies at Lehman College

Location
- 2925 Goulden Avenue; Bronx, NY; United States; 40°52′29″N 73°53′43″W

Information
- Type: Selective school
- Established: 2002
- School district: New York City Department of Education
- NCES School ID: 360008705190
- Principal: Alessandro Weiss
- Teaching staff: 27.57 (on a FTE basis)
- Grades: 9–12
- Enrollment: 393
- Student to teacher ratio: 14.25
- Campus: City: Large
- Athletics conference: PSAL
- Newspaper: Common Sense Periodical
- Website: hsas-lehman.org

The High School of American Studies at Lehman College (commonly called American Studies, HSAS, or Lehman) is a specialized high school in New York City. The school is administered by the New York City Department of Education. It receives supplementary funding from The Gilder Lehrman Institute of American History.

Together with the Queens High School for the Sciences at York College and the High School for Math, Science and Engineering at City College, it was one of the three smaller specialized high schools opened in 2002 by the New York City Department of Education, and it is one of the 9 Specialized High Schools in New York City. Admission is granted through a competitive examination known as the SHSAT. As a public school, American Studies has no tuition fee, and only residents of the City of New York are eligible to attend.

Admission to American Studies involves passing the Specialized High Schools Admissions Test. Each November, about 30,000 eighth and ninth graders take the 3-hour test for admittance to eight of the nine specialized high schools. Approximately 80–110 applicants are accepted each year.

American Studies is located on the Lehman College campus in the Jerome Park section of the Bronx.

== Overview ==
American Studies was designed as a small school for about four hundred students. It was created in 2002 along with Queens High School for the Sciences at York College, and the High School for Math, Science, and Engineering at City College. New York City previously had three specialized high schools, Brooklyn Technical High School, Bronx Science, and Stuyvesant, besides LaGuardia High School for the Performing Arts. The three new schools were created to provide more opportunities for students beyond the previous three specialized high schools.

Unlike the other specialized high schools, American Studies puts a special focus on history (particularly American History), and all students are required to study U.S. history for 3 years, and take the AP US History Exam in May of the third year. Despite the school's emphasis on history, it also offers a variety of AP classes such as Calculus, Spanish, Biology, World History, English Literature and Composition and English Language. Students are required to take AP US History exam in the spring semester of junior year after taking the course from freshman to junior year. Junior and senior year students with free periods in their schedule have the opportunity to take college courses for college credits at Lehman College in addition to Advanced Placement course credits.

=== History ===
In 2008, American Studies was awarded a gold medal by U.S. News & World Report in its ranking of the Best Public High Schools. The school was ranked 29th, beating its rivals and fellow specialized high schools Bronx High School of Science, Brooklyn Technical High School, and Stuyvesant High School. In 2009, it climbed up 10 spots and was ranked as the 19th Best Public High School, claiming the top spot for all New York City High Schools and 2nd for all of New York State.

In 2014, American Studies has held on to its gold medal by U.S. News & World Report and was ranked 32nd out of 22,000 public schools in the nation, making the school #1 in the state.

In 2015, the school was ranked 11th nationally, making it #1 in the state for the second year.

In 2016, the school was ranked 15th in the nation and #1 in the state of New York by U.S. News & World Report.

=== Affiliations with Lehman College ===
As part of the new Specialized Schools that opened in CUNY campuses, American Studies students are granted permission to enter the Lehman College campus to use the college library, gym, cafeteria, and occasionally the theater if the high school might need it for events such as plays. Students are given CUNY I.D. cards for access to the campus and for verification purposes.

=== Average SAT and ACT scores ===
In 2022, the average SAT score for American Studies was 1420 and average ACT score was 32.

== Enrollment ==
=== Admission ===
Admissions to High School of American Studies is solely based on the SHSAT, a competitive standardized test that permits entrance into Specialized High Schools. In recent years, the cut-off score, or the minimum score needed to gain entrance to American Studies, was 524. In September 2019, only 102 out of 30,000 students that applied were admitted into the school, making the acceptance rate 0.3%. High School of American Studies (HSAS) consistently ranks as among the top 100 high schools in the United States. Its most recent U.S. News & World Report ranking in 2022 puts HSAS at #8 in New York State and #49 in National Rankings. According to state test scores, 100% of students are at least proficient in math and 100% in reading.

=== Demographics ===
As of the 2024 academic year, students at HSAS are 40% White, 22% Asian, 22% Hispanic, 8% Black, 1% Native American and <1% Pacific Islander. The school has become more diverse over the last several years, with 57% white students in the 2016 academic year.

== Transportation ==
=== Public transportation ===
Similarly to the modes of transportation available to Bronx Science students, the New York City Subway's Bedford Park Boulevard (B and D trains) and Bedford Park Boulevard–Lehman College (4 train) stations are located nearby. Additionally, New York City Bus's Bx10, Bx22, Bx26 and Bx28 routes stop near HSAS. However, the company shut down in 2021. Students residing a certain distance from the school are provided full-fare or half-fare student MetroCards for public transportation.
