= Jamie Lynn =

Jamie Lynn, Jamie-Lynn, or Jamielynn is a given name which derived from the elements Jamie, a feminine (or masculine) hypocorism of James, which means "supplanter" in Hebrew, and the element Lynn which means "lake" in Welsh. Notable people with the name include:

- Jamie Lynn Corkish (born 1984), American Olympic athlete
- Jamie Lynn Macchia (born 1991), American beauty pageant titleholder
- Jamie-Lynn Sigler (born 1981), American actress on The Sopranos
- Jamie Lynn Spears (born 1991), American actress on Zoey 101
