= Long Island Interscholastic Athletic League =

Historical high school athletic league

The Long Island Interscholastic Athletic League was a high school athletic league in the New York metropolitan area during the late 19th century and early 20th century. The membership was a combination of public and private schools in Brooklyn, Queens, and Long Island.

The Long Island League was formed in 1893 with four schools competing in American football — Boys High School of Brooklyn, Adelphi Academy, Polytechnic Institute, and Bryant & Stratton Business College. When track and field started that spring, Brooklyn Latin School, St. Paul's School, and Pratt Institute had entered the league. In 1898 Erasmus Hall High School entered the league.

In its first year, the Long Island League sponsored football, track and field, baseball, and tennis. In the winter, it sponsored handball, basketball, ice skating, indoor track, and ice hockey before the end of the decade.

The Long Island League was administered by the students of the member schools. Adult advisors set venues for the various events. The students at each school formed an athletic association to sponsor and organize competition. Delegates from each school then met in league meetings to arrange schedules and organize interschool competition. Most all the competition was conducted at a loss. The winning school in each sport was usually awarded $25 to purchase a trophy.

At the beginning of the 20th century, the Long Island League faced some conflict with school administrators over regulation and control of the league. After the formation of the Public Schools Athletic League (PSAL) in 1903, the Long Island League quickly faded. In the fall of 1904, not all the schools were even scheduled to play each other, and no football champion was reported by the New York Times. The Brooklyn Boys' football championship in the fall of 1906 may have been the last league football champion. The Polytechnic Prep football championship in the fall of 1908 was probably a titular title, although the New York Times reported it as a league championship.

The last Long Island League contest appears to have been the outdoor track and field meet of 1907 between Erasmus Hall and Polytechnic Institute.
