= Erika Liriano =

Dominican Republic cocoa entrepreneur

- Born: New York City
- Education: Fame School, New York City
- Occupations: Cocoa processor and exporter
- Awards: 100 Women (BBC) (2022)

Erika Stephani Liriano is a cocoa businesswoman from the Dominican Republic.

== Childhood and education ==
Erika Liriano was brought up in Queens in New York City. Her parents were farmers and entrepreneurs from the Dominican Republic. She graduated in Performing Arts from the Fame School in Manhattan. Professionally, she initially specialized in management, commerce, and customer relations.

== Activism ==
She founded INARU, together with her sister Janett, in September 2018. The name means "woman", or "feminine energy" in the language of the indigenous Taíno people of the Caribbean. Their company aimed to improve the distribution of wealth generated by cocoa in the Dominican Republic to ensure equitable distribution among all people involved in the supply chain. In 2022 the company raised US 1.5 million in financing, partly to finance a cocoa butter factory to avoid exporting raw cocoa beans at low prices. In 2022 it gave ecological certification to 300 farmers and secured exclusive contracts for 500 tons of cocoa.

== Recognition ==
Erika Liriano was one of the BBC's 100 most inspiring women in the world in 2022. Her sister has also won recognition for her work as one of Forbes's "Top 30 Under 30 in Manufacturing and Industry".
