= High School for Math, Science and Engineering at City College =

Specialized high school in New York City

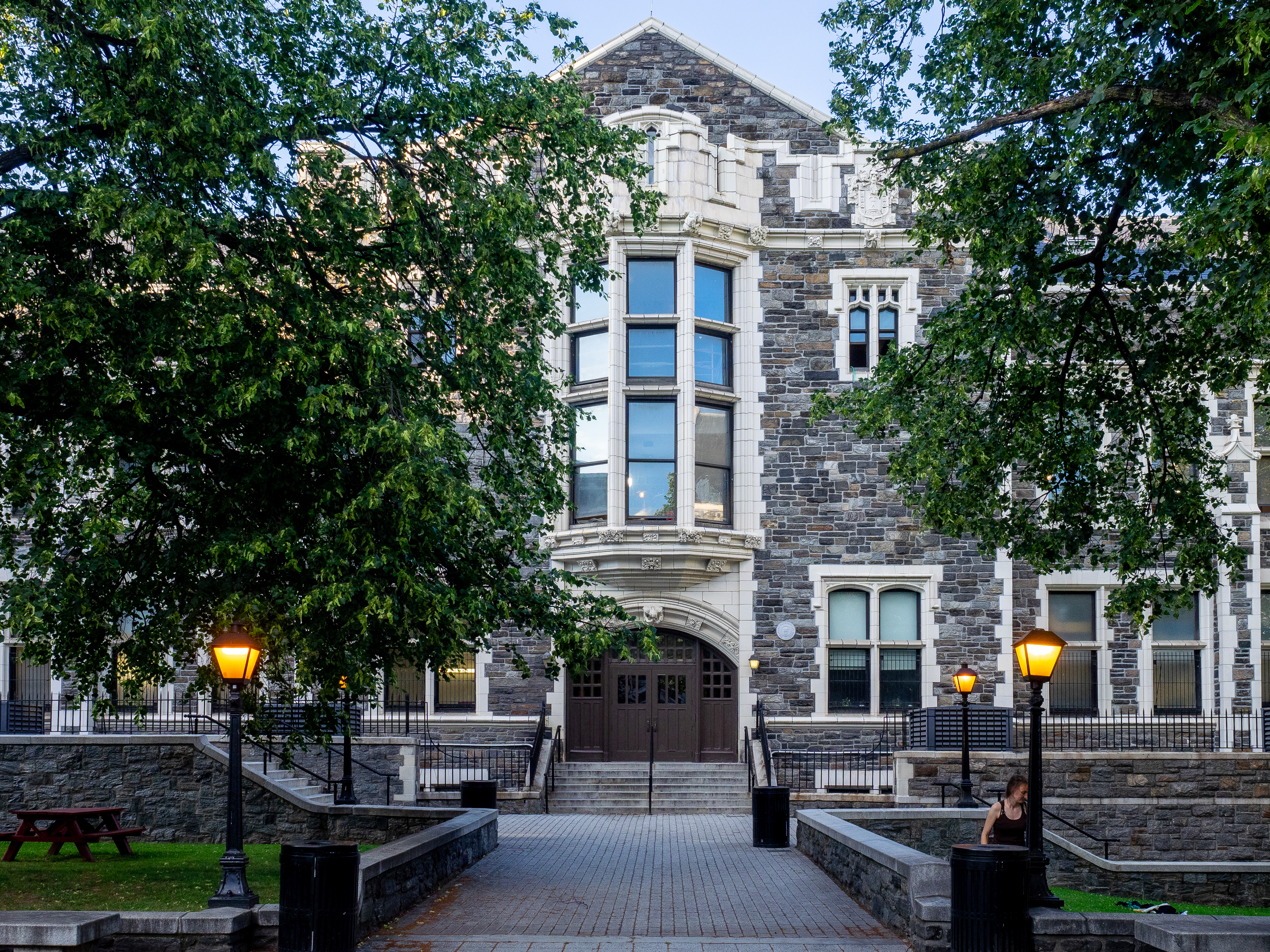
- Baskerville Hall, where HSMSE is located

Location
- 240 Convent Avenue; New York, NY; United States; 40°49′17″N 73°56′55″W

Information
- School type: Selective public high school
- Established: 2002
- Principal: Sean Dolcy
- Faculty: approx. 53
- Grades: 9 to 12
- Enrollment: 579
- Team name: Dragons
- Publication: The Echo Dr. Dragon
- Website: www.hsmse.org

The High School for Math, Science and Engineering at City College (often abbreviated to High School for Math, Science and Engineering, HSMSE, or HSMSE @ CCNY) is one of the nine specialized high schools in New York City, United States. Ranked as the #2 high school in New York (and #1 in 2024), it caters to highly gifted students residing in New York City. The highschool is ranked #26 nationally. It is on the campus of the City College of New York (CCNY).

Created in 2002 along with Queens High School for the Sciences at York College and High School of American Studies at Lehman College, HSMSE was founded with an emphasis on engineering and design and envisioned as a small school of about 400 students. Its relatively small enrollment allows students and teachers to have stronger relationships.

== Facilities and curriculum ==
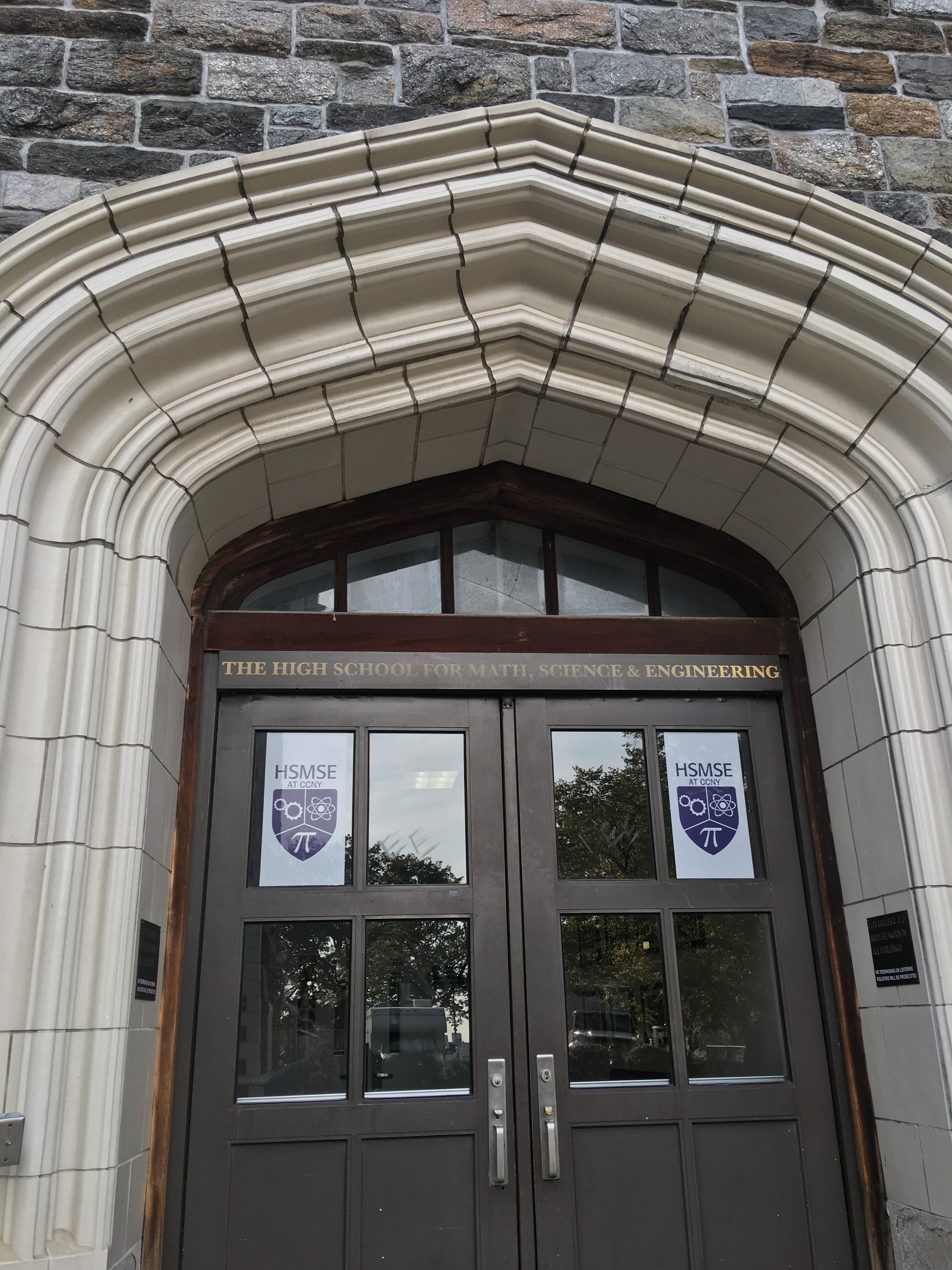
Eastern doors of the Baskerville Hall on the campus of the City College of New York, and HSMSE

HSMSE is a highly selective, college prep high school, one of nine specialized high schools in New York City. Admission is via the Specialized High Schools Admissions Test. Instructionally supported by the City College of New York, the school focuses on an intensive STEM curriculum while also emphasizing civic responsibility and the value of knowledge. As of 2025, it had a 100% four-year graduation rate.

Located on the City College campus, HSMSE is small, with about 600 students in ninth to twelfth grade. The school is on four floors of Baskerville Hall. Class sizes are small, with an average of about 24 students. In addition to a rigorous core subject program emphasizing math, science, and the humanities, students are required to take three engineering core courses through 11th grade, sponsored by Project Lead the Way.

=== German program ===
German is the core language taught at HSMSE, which has one of the largest high school German programs in the United States. HSMSE's founders believed that German is the language of engineering. As a result, about 75% of HSMSE students study German, which is offered through the Advanced Placement level, and many continue to study it in college. The school employs three full-time German teachers and is one of nine US partner schools of the PASCH program of the Goethe Institut through its "Schools: Partners for the Future" program. Every summer, HSMSE sends a few students on funded study trips to Germany with the Goethe Institute and the American Association of Teachers of German. The school also offers advanced Spanish for students who pass the Second Language Proficiency (SLP) exam in Spanish in middle school. Those students begin Spanish at the second-year level.

=== Transportation ===
The New York City Subway's 137th Street-City College (1 train), 135th Street (B and C trains), and 145th Street (A, B, C, and D trains) stations are nearby. New York City Bus's M2, M3, M4, M5, M11, M100, M101 and Bx33 routes stop near HSMSE. Students residing a certain distance from the school are provided student OMNY cards for public transportation.

== Student life ==
HSMSE has a diverse student body; in 2013 it was estimated to be the most diverse in New York City, with 130 Asian, 75 Black and African American, 99 Hispanic, and 101 White students. The faculty is notably dedicated, many devoting personal time to mentoring students, coaching teams, and supporting extracurricular activities. Support mechanisms are in place for students who struggle, through informal peer tutoring and daily tutoring sessions offered by every teacher.

Virtually all HSMSE students go on to college, many to highly selective colleges. As part of the school's efforts to increase diversity, the Discover program offers admission to some students whose SHSAT test scores are lower than the usual minimum.

== Rankings ==
U.S. News & World Report featured HSMSE as the #1 high school in New York City and New York State, placing 22nd in the national US rankings in 2023.

HSMSE was ranked the city's third-best public high school in The New York Post's annual school ranking. In 2013, HSMSE was ranked among the nation's top high schools by U.S. News & World Report, and in 2017, U.S. News & World Report ranked HSMSE third in the state and 26th nationally.

In May 2013, HSMSE was ranked #1 in the country by Working in Support of Education (W!se) for personal finance education. HSMSE was ranked by W!se as first in the nation in financial literacy in 2017.
