= Queens High School for the Sciences =

Specialized high school in New York City

- Queens High School for the Sciences building in Jamaica, Queens in 2026

Location
- 165-18 Hillside Avenue; Jamaica, Queens, New York 11432; United States

Information
- Other names: QHSS
- Type: Selective public high school
- Established: 2002; 24 years ago
- School district: New York City Department of Education
- School number: Q687
- CEEB code: 332549
- NCES School ID: 360010005297
- Principal: Ana De Jesús
- Teaching staff: 29.86 (on an FTE basis)
- Grades: Ninth grade to Twelfth grade
- Gender: Mixed-sex education
- Enrollment: 494 (2024-2025)
- Student to teacher ratio: 17.41
- Mascot: The Cardinal
- Newspaper: The Comet Chronicles
- Website: Official website

Queens High School for the Sciences (QHSS), formerly known as Queens High School for the Sciences at York College, is a public specialized high school in Jamaica, Queens, New York, United States. The school is operated by the New York City Department of Education (NYCDOE).

== History ==
Queens High School for the Sciences opened in September 2002 on the campus of York College, City University of New York, initially enrolling approximately 125 ninth-grade students. It was one of three specialized high schools established that year, alongside the High School for Math, Science and Engineering at City College and the High School of American Studies.

For its first 24 years, QHSS operated in 14 classrooms on the second floor of York College's science building. By 2025, students and families were advocating for a dedicated school facility, citing overcrowding and limited access to amenities, including laboratories, a gymnasium, and an auditorium.

On February 25, 2026, the New York City Panel for Educational Policy unanimously approved relocating QHSS to Building Q497 in Jamaica, Queens, alongside a District 75 program. The new building, with a total capacity of 876 students across both programs, opened in September 2026. According to Department of Education projections, QHSS enrollment is expected to increase to approximately 700 students by the 2029–2030 school year. QHSS's new address is 165-18 Hillside Avenue.

Courtyard and outdoor recreation area

== School climate ==
In the 2024 New York City School Survey, based on 18 teacher responses, Queens High School for the Sciences received positive response rates of 28% for teacher–principal trust, 33% for teacher influence, and 40% for instructional leadership.

In the 2026 survey, based on 21 teacher responses, the corresponding figures increased to 61%, 66%, and 77%, respectively.

== Admissions ==
Admission is determined through the Specialized High Schools Admissions Test (SHSAT). QHSS is the only specialized high school located in Queens.

== Transportation ==
The school is located on Hillside Avenue in Jamaica, Queens. The 169th Street station on the IND Queens Boulevard Line, served by the F train, is the nearest New York City Subway station. Several New York City Bus routes also operate along Hillside Avenue.

== Curriculum ==
QHSS offers college preparatory courses in mathematics and science, with honors, Advanced Placement (AP), and college-level courses. Some courses allow students to earn college credit through dual enrollment with York College, City University of New York.

The mathematics curriculum includes AP Calculus AB, AP Calculus BC, and AP Statistics. Science courses include biology, chemistry, physics, environmental science, and electives such as genetics and forensic science. Computer science offerings include AP Computer Science Principles and programming courses.

The humanities curriculum includes English and social studies, with AP English Language and Composition, AP World History, and AP United States History. The school also offers arts and world language courses, including Spanish-language literature and Mandarin Chinese.

== Extracurricular activities ==
QHSS offers student clubs and extracurricular activities spanning academic, cultural, artistic, and community interests. Club availability varies depending on enrollment, budget, and staffing.

=== Athletics ===
QHSS participates in the Public Schools Athletic League (PSAL), with varsity teams in badminton, bowling, handball, swimming, tennis, and volleyball.

== Awards and recognition ==
In 2024, U.S. News & World Report ranked QHSS first among public high schools in New York State and 25th nationally.

According to the 2023–2024 school performance dashboard, the school had high-percentile graduation rates, test scores, advanced-course participation rates, and attendance statistics compared with other NYCDOE high schools.

== Former principals ==
- Brian Jetter — founding principal retired June 2006.
- Jie Zhang — June 2006–June 2011.
- David Marmor — June 2011–2013.
- Lenneen Gibson — 2013–October 2016.
- B.D. Anthony — interim principal, November 2016.
