= Staten Island Technical High School =

Specialized high school in New York City

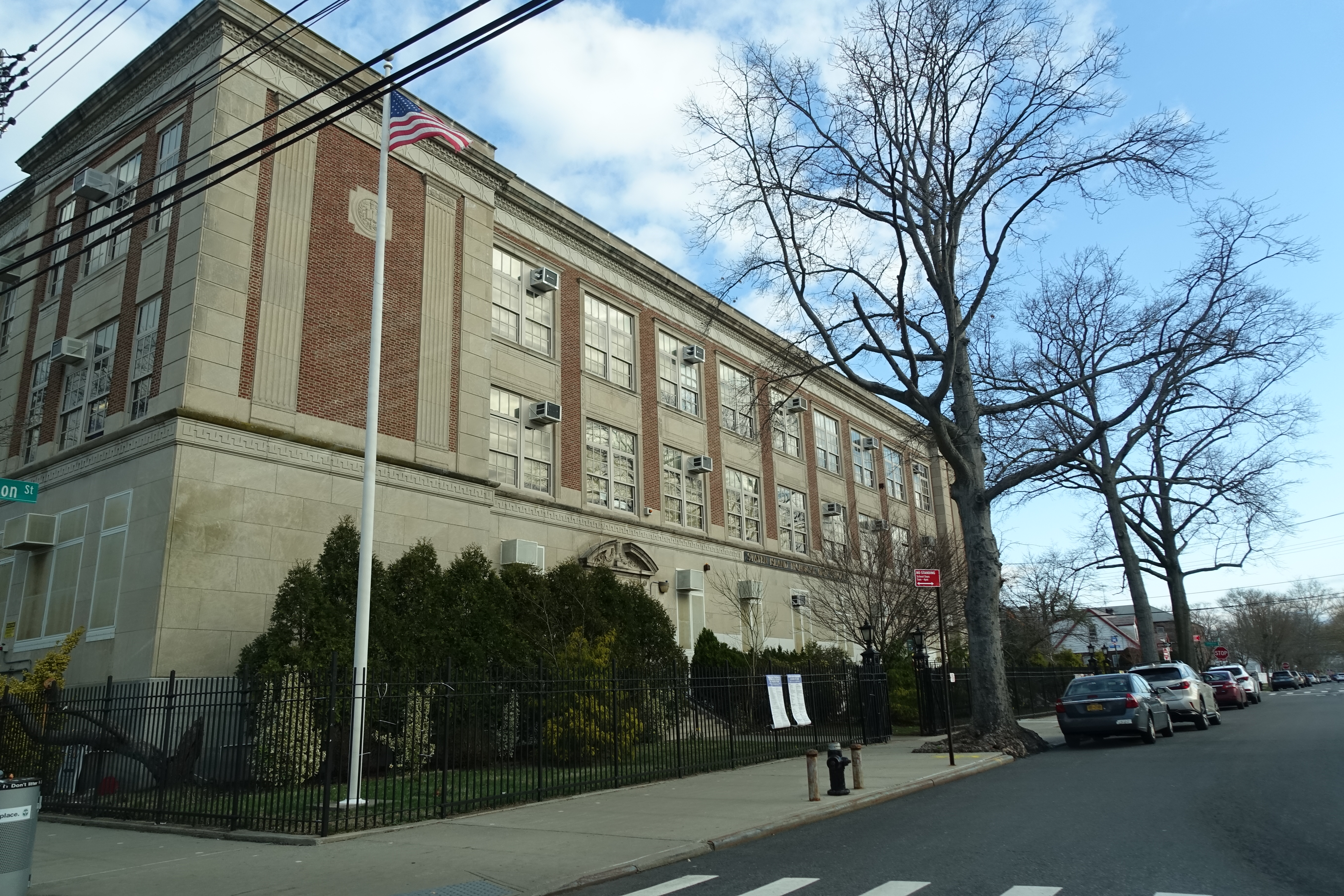

Location
- 485 Clawson St; Staten Island, New York 10306; United States; 40°34′4.54″N 74°6′55.18″W

Information
- Type: Public, selective
- Established: 1988; 38 years ago
- School district: New York City Department of Education
- Superintendent: Marion Wilson
- School number: R605
- NCES School ID: 360010304186
- Dean: Diane Federico, Dorothy Mannino
- Principal: Mark Erlenwein
- Teaching staff: 80.38 (on an FTE basis)
- Grades: 9-12
- Enrollment: 1,374 (2022–2023)
- Student to teacher ratio: 17.09
- Campus: City: Large
- Colors: Black and Vegas Gold
- Mascot: Seagulls
- Nickname: Tech, SITHS, Sitech
- Accreditation: University of the State of New York
- Newspaper: The Tech Times
- Yearbook: Epoch
- Budget: $9,683,993
- Website: www.siths.org

Staten Island Technical High School, commonly called Staten Island Tech, SITHS, or Tech by Staten Islanders, was founded in 1988. Located in Staten Island, New York City, the public specialized high school is operated by the New York City Department of Education. Admission to SITHS is determined through an applicant's score on the Specialized High Schools Admissions Test.

== History ==
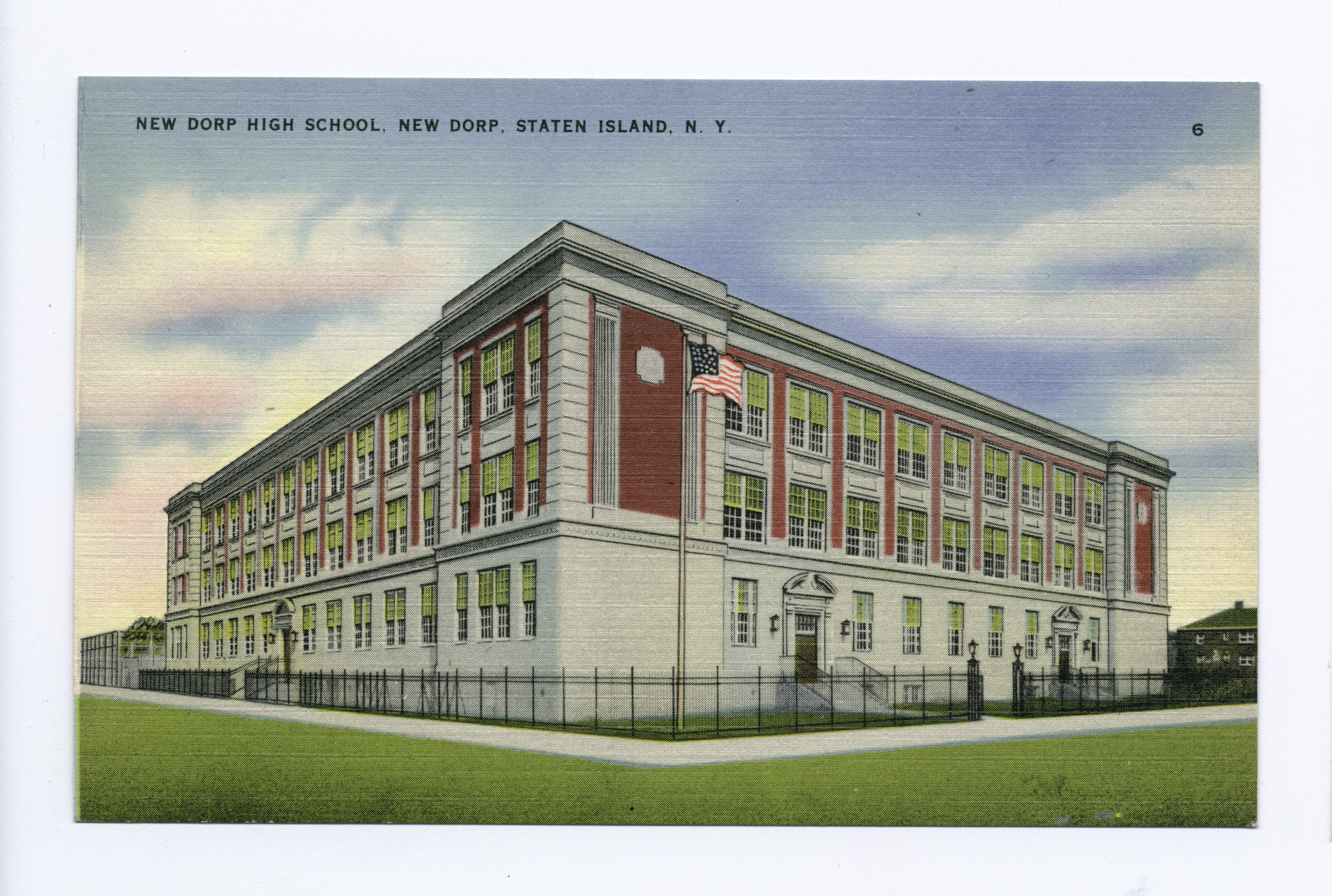
A depiction of New Dorp High School, which currently houses SITHS

The school was established in 1988. And offers a college preparatory curriculum. The school also has an art engineering and computer laboratories. SITHS is designated as having a specialized high school status. SITHS is one of the schools established under New York State Law 2590 Section-G to serve the needs of gifted New York City students.

SITHS was originally the engineering program from Ralph McKee Vocational and Technical High School. New Dorp High School had moved to a new campus in 1982 due to the growing student population. John DePalma was the Assistant Principal assigned to bring the engineering program to the former New Dorp campus so that the building would not be abandoned or used for other purposes. Through DePalma's leadership, teachers Alan Bailey, Irv Berson, and others made unauthorized renovations to the building, creating laboratory space for the engineering classes.

In 1987, the program was nearly shuttered because of a lack of enrollment. Nicholas M. Bilotti was named the Program Director as DePalma retired. Bilotti began a program of increasing enrollment, changing the course away from a strict engineering program, and targeting female students. His renovation of DePalma's foundation is the base that Tech lives on today.

== Curriculum ==
The curriculum at SITHS is purely college preparatory, focusing on science and engineering. Electronic devices, like iPads, tablets, and laptops are mostly integrated into classroom instruction to enhance lessons. The mandatory engineering classes taken by students include Intro to AV Engineering and TV Studio and Intro to STEM Engineering and Robotics.

Students can also choose from 16 (15, not including Russian) Advanced Placement courses offered at the school.

AP Courses in SITHS
Category	Available courses
Science	AP Chemistry; AP Biology; AP Psychology; AP Environmental Science; AP Physics 1; AP Physics 2; AP Physics C: Mechanics; College Forensic Science; College Biotechnology
History	AP US Government and Politics; AP Macroeconomics; AP US History; AP World History
Language	AP English Language and Composition; AP English Literature; AP Russian Language and Culture (Course not administered by College Board)
Math	AP Calculus AB; AP Calculus BC; AP Statistics
Technology	AP Computer Science Principles

== Athletics and extracurricular activities ==
=== Athletics ===
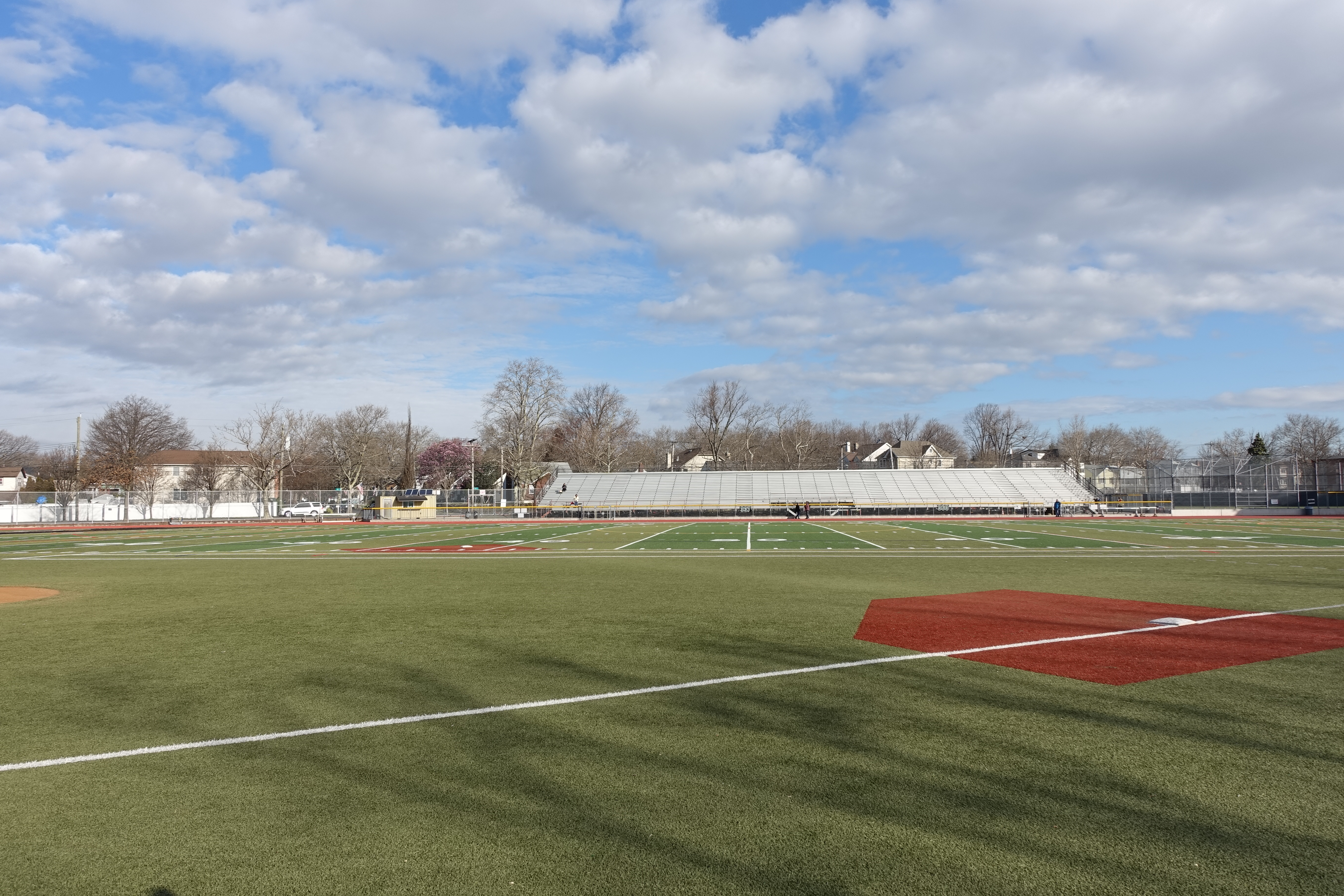
The athletic field next to the school in 2022.

SITHS's sports program operates in partnership with McKee High School, and their shared teams are known as the MSIT Seagulls. The MSIT teams play various sports including football, basketball, baseball, softball, soccer, volleyball, wrestling, fencing, swimming, badminton, tennis, table tennis, and track. The MSIT Football team won the 2010 and 2011 PSAL Cup Championship. MSIT's Boys' Track team made cross-country state appearances from 1996 to 2000, and again from 2006 to 2010.

Tech offers several co-curricular options for physical education, including weight training, yoga and aerobics, dance, volleyball, basketball, and marching band.

=== Extracurricular activities ===
SITHS maintains an active theater program, including productions such as SING! and a spring musical. The theater program is directed by drama teacher Heather Brown in coordination with the school's Tech Crew, a group of students tasked with maintaining the theater and operating sound and lighting for the school's auditorium. In 2011, the school installed a new television studio that works closely with the Tech Crew and provides a different aspect of technical operations.

SITHS's robotics team is a fairly developed team. The team competes in the FIRST Robotics Competition as Team 375, or "The Robotic Plague", and regularly manages to advance into the semi-finals. In the 2006 season, they were the Regional Winners. They also won the Chairman's award for their robot, the "Rambo". and won the Autodesk Inventor Animation Award at the New York City Regional. However, it has since been disbanded.

Tech also hosts more than eighty clubs. These include: Junior State of America, Key Club, Model United Nations, Do Something, Chess Club, newspaper, literary magazine, Strategic Fighting Game Club, HIV/AIDS Awareness Team, Anime Club, Celtic club, Asian American Club, CAD Club, Christian Seekers, Guitar Club, Jewish Club, and Muslim Students' Association. Tech also has a chapter of the National Honor Society and Tri-M, which both inducts members after a selective process in their junior year. Tech also has a GSA, called the True Equality Alliance (TEA) Club.

The academic teams of SITHS are strong contenders in various regional and state-wide competitions. The Science Olympiad Team consistently places second in the NYC Regionals and consistently places in the top ten for NY States competition. Many students on the Math Team qualify for AIME, and the Freshmen Math Team earned 1st place out of all teams (most of which consisted solely of seniors) competing at the Staten Island Mathematics Tournament in June 2019.

== In popular culture ==
SITHS was used in the production of 1998 film Joe the King.

SITHS was mentioned during the introduction to The Daily Show with Jon Stewart.

The school's 2012 SING! winner was announced by Saturday Night Live cast member Andy Samberg, who recorded a short clip to reveal the winner. The school's 2013 SING! winner was announced by singer/songwriter and tech alumna Ingrid Michaelson, who similarly recorded a short clip to reveal the winner. The school's 2014 SING! winner was supposed to be announced by the Impractical Jokers, with another short clip, but was never played due to technical difficulties.

== Notable alumni ==
- Ingrid Michaelson, Class of 1997, musician
- Brian Esposito, Class of 1997, baseball player
- Andrew Kozak, Class of 2000, meteorologist
- Josh Blackman, Class of 2002, legal scholar
- Jamie Lynn Macchia, Class of 2009, Miss New York 2015
