= LaGuardia New Music Ensemble =

Coordinates: 40.774046°N 73.985473°W

The LaGuardia New Music Ensemble is a composition collective at New York's LaGuardia School for Music and Art. It is notable for being the incubator of multiple industry professionals and the host of popular music composition seminars. The ensemble is best known for its collaborations with the NPR program Radiolab.

The ensemble was founded in 1997 as the "New Music Singers" by pianist and teacher Billy Bobby Apostle. The seminar itself is loosely structured, offering students the opportunity to collaborate individually and present their compositions with open critique. While originally focused on jazz improvisation, the course has strongly shifted over time to reflect current musical trends. The ensemble currently admits twenty-five composers, musicians, and producers each year, releases two commercial recordings and typically performs three to four shows.

== Notable members ==
Since its 1997 incarnation, the collective has included over three hundred members, many of which have become industry professionals. A few of its notable members include the following:

- Pia Toscano, finalist on American Idol.
- Dan Romer, composer known for the score to Beasts of the Southern Wild.
- Bridget Kelly, New York based R&B musician.
- India Carney, Season 8 of The Voice.
- Azealia Banks, pop singer.
- Wynter Gordon, pop songwriter and performer.
- Rachel Zevita, contestant on Season 10 of American Idol.
- Qaasim Middleton, guitarist for The Naked Brothers Band.
- Marcus Gilmore, prodigious jazz drummer and member of pianist Vijay Iyer's trio.
- Adam O'Farrill, jazz trumpet player and son of pianist Arturo O'Farrill.
