= Jamie Lynn Macchia =

Miss New York 2015

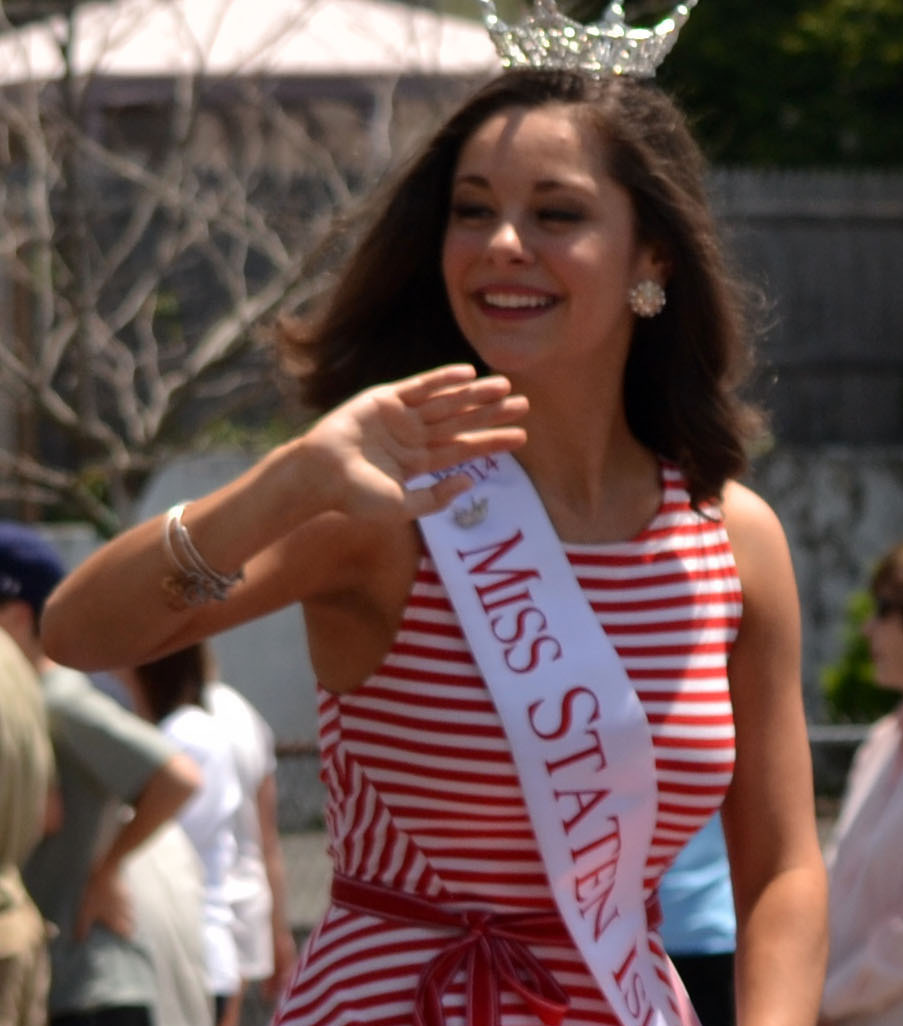
- Born: October 24, 1991 (age 34); Staten Island, New York
- Education: Wagner College
- Beauty pageant titleholder
- Title: Miss Staten Island 2012; Miss Greater New York 2013; Miss Staten Island 2014; Miss Greater New York 2015; Miss New York 2015
- Major competition: Miss America 2016
- Website: http://jamielynnmacchia.weebly.com/

Jamie Lynn Macchia (born October 24, 1991) is an American beauty pageant titleholder from Eltingville, Staten Island, New York, who was crowned Miss New York 2015. She competed for the Miss America 2016 title in September 2015.

== Pageant career ==
=== Miss Staten Island ===
Macchia began vying for the Miss Staten Island crown when she was 17 and a student at Staten Island Technical High School. In November 2008, she was second runner-up for the Miss Staten Island 2009 title. In November 2009, she placed first runner-up to Jennifer Scacco for the Miss Staten Island 2010 title and won a $2,000 scholarship. On November 12, 2011, Macchia won the Miss Staten Island 2012 title and received $3,000 in scholarship money. She later returned in November 2013 and won the Miss Staten Island 2014 title, becoming the first [and only] woman in the pageant's history to win the title twice.

=== Vying for Miss New York ===
As Miss Staten Island 2012, Macchia then competed in the 2012 Miss New York pageant in June 2012. Macchia was top-11 semi-finalist. On March 30, 2013, Macchia won the Miss Greater New York 2013 title then, in July 2013, competed in the 2013 Miss New York pageant. She was not a finalist for the state title. In November 2013, Macchia won the Miss Staten Island 2014 title, the first woman to win the title a second time. In May 2014, she competed in the 2014 Miss New York pageant. She was named was second runner-up to winner Kira Kazantsev.

When Kazantsev was elevated to Miss America 2015, both first runner-up Desiree Wiley and second runner-up Macchia declined the promotion to serve as Miss New York 2014 to preserve their chance to win the state title in 2015 and compete for Miss America 2016. Instead, third runner-up Jillian Tapper accepted the promotion and the crown. Macchia later accepted an invitation to participate in the National Sweetheart 2014 pageant at the Sweet Corn Festival in Hoopeston, Illinois. She placed first runner-up for the national title.

=== Miss New York 2015 ===
Macchia was crowned Miss Greater New York 2015 which made her eligible to compete for the 2015 Miss New York title. Entering the state pageant in June 2015, Macchia's competition talent was dancing to "I Was Here" by Beyoncé. Her platform is "Inspiring Action Against Pediatric Cancer". Macchia chose this work in honor of a childhood friend who fought but ultimately died from leukemia.

Macchia won the competition on Saturday, June 6, 2015, when she received her crown from outgoing Miss New York titleholder Jillian Tapper. She earned more than $25,000 in scholarship money from the state pageant. She also won the Children's Miracle Network Miracle Maker Award and the Miss America Organization Academic Award.

As Miss New York, her activities include public appearances across the state. Macchia was New York's representative at the Miss America 2016 pageant in Atlantic City, New Jersey, in September 2015.

== Early life and education ==
Macchia is a native of Eltingville, Staten Island, New York, and a 2009 graduate of Staten Island Technical High School. Her father is Anthony Macchia and her mother is Dawn Macchia. She has a younger brother, A.J.

Macchia is a 2013 magna cum laude graduate of Wagner College, earning a bachelor of science degree in arts administration and marketing. While a student at Wagner College, Macchia became a member of the Alpha Omicron Pi international women's fraternity.

Awards and achievements
Preceded by Jillian Tapper	Miss New York; 2015	Succeeded by Camille Sims
