= Specialized High Schools Admissions Test =

New York City admission test for elite high schools

- Acronym: SHSAT
- Type: Computer-based standardized admissions test (as of 2025)
- Administrator: New York City Department of Education (Administrator), Pearson Assessments (Developer/Grader)
- Skills tested: ELA, Mathematics
- Purpose: Admission into Specialized high schools in New York City
- Duration: 3 hours
- Offered: October or November
- Restrictions on attempts: Once in eighth grade and once in ninth grade
- Regions: New York City, United States
- Languages: English
- Annual number of test takers: 25,678 in 2024
- Used by: Specialized high schools in New York City
- Qualification rate: 15.9% in 2024
- Website: www.schools.nyc.gov/learning/testing/specialized-high-school-admissions-test

The Specialized High Schools Admissions Test (SHSAT) is an examination administered to eighth and ninth-grade students residing in New York City and used to determine admission to eight of the city's nine Specialized High Schools (SHS). In 2024, 25,678 students took the test, and 4,072 (15.9%) received scores qualifying to receive an offer. Approximately 800 students each year are offered admission through the Discovery program, which fills approximately twenty percent of every matriculated class of each SHS with students from lower-income (qualified for reduced-price lunch) backgrounds who can qualify through a summer study program instead of reaching the cutoff score.

The test is administered each year in October and November, and students are informed of their results the following March. Those who receive offers decide by the middle of March whether to attend the school the following September. The test is independently produced and graded by American Guidance Service, a subsidiary of Pearson Education, under contract to the New York City Department of Education.

== Applicability ==
The SHSAT is used for admission to the following schools:

- Bronx High School of Science
- Brooklyn Latin School
- Brooklyn Technical High School
- High School of American Studies at Lehman College
- High School for Math, Science and Engineering at City College
- Queens High School for the Sciences
- Staten Island Technical High School
- Stuyvesant High School

Admission to the remaining specialized high school, Fiorello H. LaGuardia High School of Music & Art and Performing Arts, is determined by audition or portfolio rather than by exam.

== The Hecht-Calandra Act ==
In 1970, chancellor of the New York City public school system Harvey B. Scribner launched a study to investigate allegations that the specialized schools were "culturally biased" against Latino and Black students. In response, legislators passed the Hecht-Calandra Act of 1971, which codified the SHSAT into state law as the sole consideration for admissions at three of the specialized schools: Stuyvesant High School, Brooklyn Technical High School, and the Bronx High School of Science.

The debate of whether or not the SHSAT for specialized schools was discriminatory dates back to the passing of the act, as minority legislators who were against the act "accused white colleagues of seeking an exclusionary racial quota at the schools" due to limitations on the size of the Discovery program.

== 2020 Discovery expansion ==
In October 2013, it was reported that the number of African American and Latino students being admitted into SHSAT schools over the past five years had declined. In response, the Community Service Society and the NAACP Legal Defense and Educational Fund filed a complaint in the United States Department of Education's Office of Civil Rights (OCR), asserting that the Hecht-Calandra Act requires only the Bronx High School of Science, Brooklyn Technical High School, and Stuyvesant High School to use the SHSAT for admissions, that the five other schools that used the SHSAT for admission were not required to do so, and that their doing so violated the civil rights of Black and Latino students. The position of the New York Department of Education was that applicants for all eight specialized high schools were legally required to take the SHSAT. The OCR opened an investigation.

In 2018, Mayor of New York City Bill de Blasio proposed changes to the admission process of the specialized high schools. One of the proposed changes was repealing the Hecht-Calandra Act and replacing the SHSAT with a more "holistic" approach that took other aspects of a student's education into consideration with no testing. However, the change did not happen, as due to the act, the city is not allowed to unilaterally remove the SHSAT. New York State Senate Bill S3087, sponsored in 2021 by State Senator Julia Salazar, sought to repeal the act, but was shelved in committee. There was a legal question on whether the city had the power to reclassify the 5 other specialized schools not explicitly mentioned in the act in order to change their admission processes. A coalition of SHS alumni associations, SHS alumni, and SHS parents was formed to combat these changes.

Instead of doing away with SHSAT testing entirely, a compromise was reached whereby 20 percent of each class of every SHS was now filled via the Discovery program, which hosts a summer study program at each SHS for students from disadvantaged (qualifying for reduced-price lunch) backgrounds who took the SHSAT but did not reach the qualifying score. Prior to this change, the Discovery program filled only 5 percent of each class at five of the specialized high schools, and had not recently been used at all for Stuyvesant High School, the Bronx High School of Science, or the High School of American Studies at Lehman College. The racial distribution of Discovery students, as of 2024, has drastically lower numbers of white (9% vs. 26%) and multi-racial (1% vs. 5%) students, and higher numbers of Black (12% vs. 5%) and Latino (21% vs. 8%) students, than that of SHS matriculants with a qualifying score; however, Discovery also had an even larger proportion of Asian students (56%) than that of SHS matriculants scoring above the cutoff (52%).

== Testing locations ==
The SHSAT is given in late October (8th grade) or early November (9th grade and 8th grade with IEPs, 504 plans, and ELL). The test is administered at the tester’s NYCDOE middle schools and testing centers located in Manhattan at Stuyvesant High School, in the Bronx at Bronx High School of Science, in Brooklyn at Brooklyn Technical High School, Sunset Park High School, or James Madison High School, in Queens at Long Island City High School, Hillcrest High School, or John Adams High School, and in Staten Island at Staten Island Technical High School.

== Admission ==
Students must choose which schools they wish to apply to, up to eight, and indicate them in order of preference on an application portal before the day of the exam. The test is offered to all eighth and ninth-grade students residing within New York City, though the majority of applicants are eighth graders.

The list of scores is processed in descending order, with each student being placed in their most preferred school that still has open seats and continuing until there are no remaining open seats at any school. The grading of the test is not proportional to raw score and is formalized by the New York City Department of Education.

== Examination format ==
The SHSAT tests for grammar and ability in both English and mathematics. The examination is 180 minutes long. It is recommended that 90 minutes be used for each section, but the time can be divided in any way students wish: however, if a student qualifies for an IEP, the time may be increased. In addition, a student who has certain medical conditions can also get an increased amount of time, and all students who qualify for a time extension receive doubled time. There is no break between the sections and electronic calculators and other calculation aids are not permitted during the test.

=== ELA ===
57 multiple choice questions:

- 9–11 revising/editing
- 46–48 reading comprehension, divided among 5–6 nonfiction (2–3) and fiction (2–3) passages

=== Mathematics ===
52 multiple choice questions and 5 grid-in questions:

- Algebra
- Factoring
- Substitution
- Geometry
- Basic coordinate graphing
- Logic
- Word problems
- 3D geometry and nets

=== Grading ===
There is no penalty for wrong answers. The total number of correct answers (the raw score) is converted into a scaled score through a formula that the Department of Education does not release, and which varies from year to year. The scaled score is an integer between 20 and about 350. The scaled score is then used to determine the composite score, an integer between 40 and about 700, which is used to determine a student's standing. The scaled score is not proportional to the raw scores.

The cut-off scores for each school vary yearly, determined by the number of open places in each school and how the candidates score. Students are notified of their scores in March. The Department of Education usually does not publish score results, so most numbers are self-reported by parents on public forums. However, the DOE did release the cut-off scores for each specialized high school for 2022 (for which the tests themselves were taken in 2021). That year, the cutoff scores were the following: Stuyvesant High School: 563; Queens High School for the Sciences at York College: 523; Bronx High School of Science: 524; Staten Island Technical High School: 527; High School for Math, Science and Engineering at City College: 532; High School of American Studies at Lehman College: 516; Brooklyn Technical High School: 506; and Brooklyn Latin School: 497.

The 9th-grade SHSAT cutoff scores tend to be much higher due to limited seats for incoming 10th graders in the schools. Some schools, such as Stuyvesant and Bronx Science, may only have 3–10 seats each year for incoming 10th graders, while Brooklyn Technical High School, the school with the largest student body, may only have around 20–30 seats. Depending on the year, the number of seats is available in the NYC High School Directory Book given to all students applying for admission to a high school. Each year, an average of 50–60 ninth-grade students get into the specialized schools out of an estimated 3,000 test-takers. In 2022, the cutoff scores were the following: Stuyvesant High School: 563; Queens High School for the Sciences at York College: 541; Bronx High School of Science: 551; Staten Island Technical High School: 525; High School for Math, Science and Engineering at City College: 549; High School of American Studies at Lehman College: 541; Brooklyn Technical High School; 546; and Brooklyn Latin School: 545.

== Department of Education programs ==
The New York Specialized High School Institute (SHSI) is a free program run by New York City for middle school students with high test scores on citywide tests and high report card grades. The program's original intent was to expand the population of Black and Latino students by offering them test-taking tips and extra lessons, but anyone can apply. As of 2006, 3,781 students were enrolled at 17 locations. They spend 16 months, starting in the summer after sixth grade, preparing for the test.

Certain applicants who score just below the cutoff and are recommended by their guidance counselor may qualify for the Summer Discovery Program. Successful completion of this program allows the students to gain admission to a specialized high school. The students must:

1. have scored within a particular range below the SHSAT cutoff score; and
2. be certified as disadvantaged by their middle school according to any of the following criteria:

a. attend a Title 1 school and be from a family whose total income is documented as meeting federal income eligibility guidelines established for school food services by the New York State Department of Agriculture; or
b. receive assistance from the Human Resources Administration; or
c. be a member of a family whose income is documented as being equivalent to or below Department of Social Services standards; or
d. be a foster child or ward of the state; or
e. have initially entered the United States within the last four years, live in a home in which the language customarily spoken is not English, and be recommended by their local school as having a high potential for the specialized high school program.

== Fairness ==
In November 2005, a New York Times article found that students scoring in the 90th percentile on both sections would not gain admittance to their first-choice schools, while those scoring in the 99th percentile on one section and the 50th percentile on the other would. This occurs because the final scaled score is reflective of the curve within sections more than of the total correct answers across sections.

Admission is based solely on SHSAT performance for the 80% of students who do not come through the Discovery program. Furthermore, despite the fact that SHSI's original intent was to expand the population of African American and Latino students in the specialized high schools by offering test-taking tips and extra lessons, it has seen attrition among those students as students of any racial or ethnic background may apply for admission.
