= Brooklyn Latin School =

Specialized high school in New York City

The Brooklyn Latin School
- Schola Latina Brookliniensis

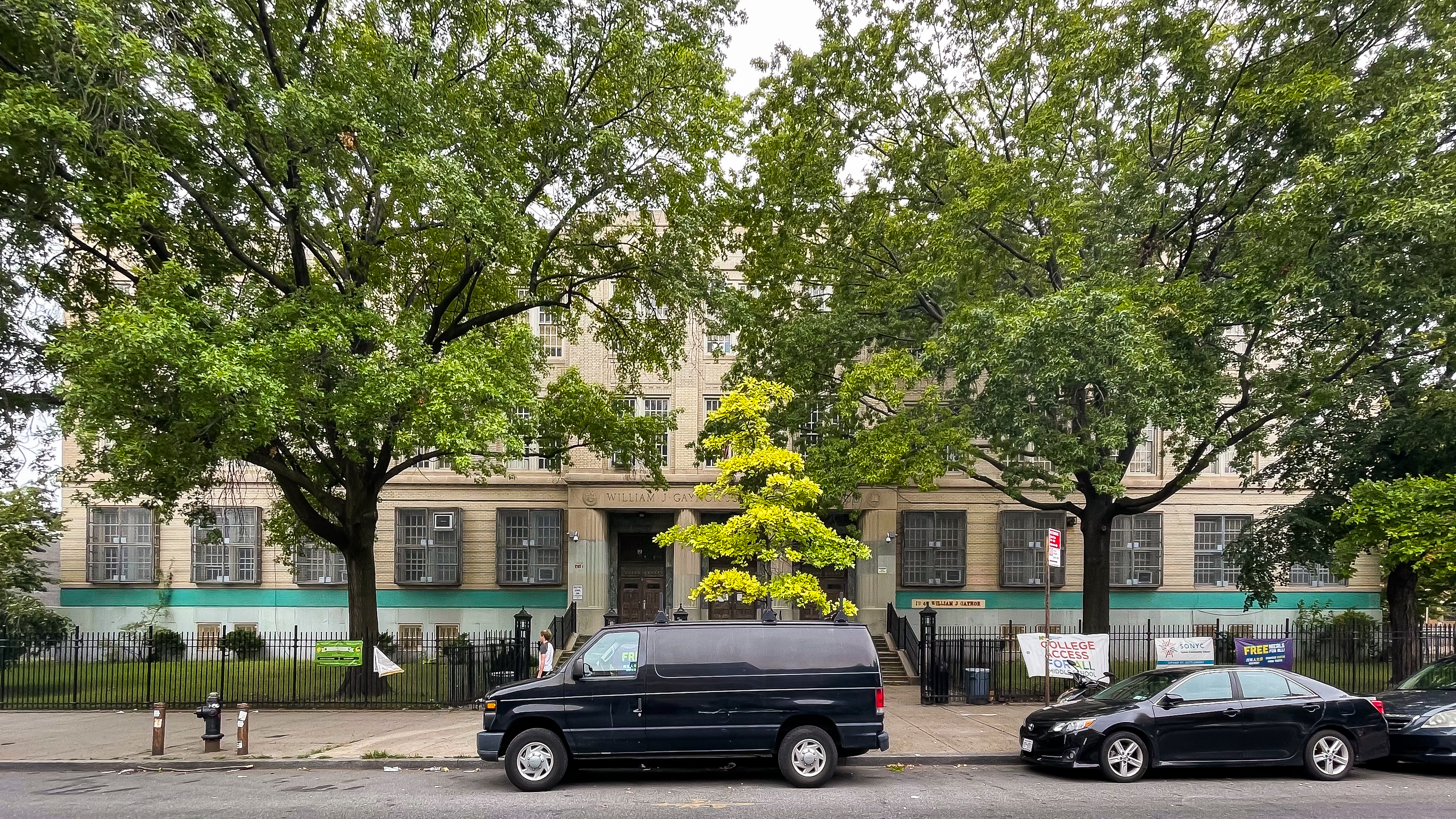
- Seen from Graham Avenue

Location
- 223 Graham Avenue; Brooklyn, New York; United States; 40°42′18″N 73°56′20″W

Information
- Type: Selective school
- Motto: Cui multum sit datum, multum ab eo postulabitur. English: To whom much has been given, much will be expected.
- Established: September 2006; 20 years ago
- Headmaster: Katrina Billy-Wilkinson
- Faculty: 37
- Grades: 9–12
- Enrollment: 807
- Colors: Purple and white
- Mascot: Titans
- Nickname: TBLS
- Newspaper: The Brooklyn Latineer
- Website: brooklynlatin.org

The Brooklyn Latin School is a public specialized high school in New York City. It opened in September 2006. The ideals governing Brooklyn Latin are borrowed largely from the Boston Latin School, and popular society's ideals. The school’s founding headmaster was Jason Griffiths.

The school spent its first five years at 325 Bushwick Avenue, in limited space. In 2013 it moved to 223 Graham Avenue (originally I.S. 49), not far from the previous school. In that same year it was named as one of New York State's top public schools.

== Course of study ==
=== IB at TBLS ===
The Brooklyn Latin School is the only specialized high school in New York City that has implemented the IB Diploma Programme.

== Enrollment ==
Admission to the Brooklyn Latin School is based exclusively on an entrance examination, known as the Specialized High Schools Admissions Test (SHSAT), open to all eighth and ninth grade New York City students. The test covers math (word problems and computation) and verbal (reading comprehension and grammar) skills. Out of the approximately 30,000 students taking the entrance examination for the September 2011 admission round (with 14,529 students listing Brooklyn Latin as a choice on their application), about 572 offers were made, making for an acceptance rate of 3.9%.

In contrast to the other specialized high schools, Brooklyn Latin was known for its diversity in its early years.

== See also ==
- Roxbury Latin School
- Boston Latin School
