= Fiorello H. LaGuardia High School =

Specialized high school in New York City

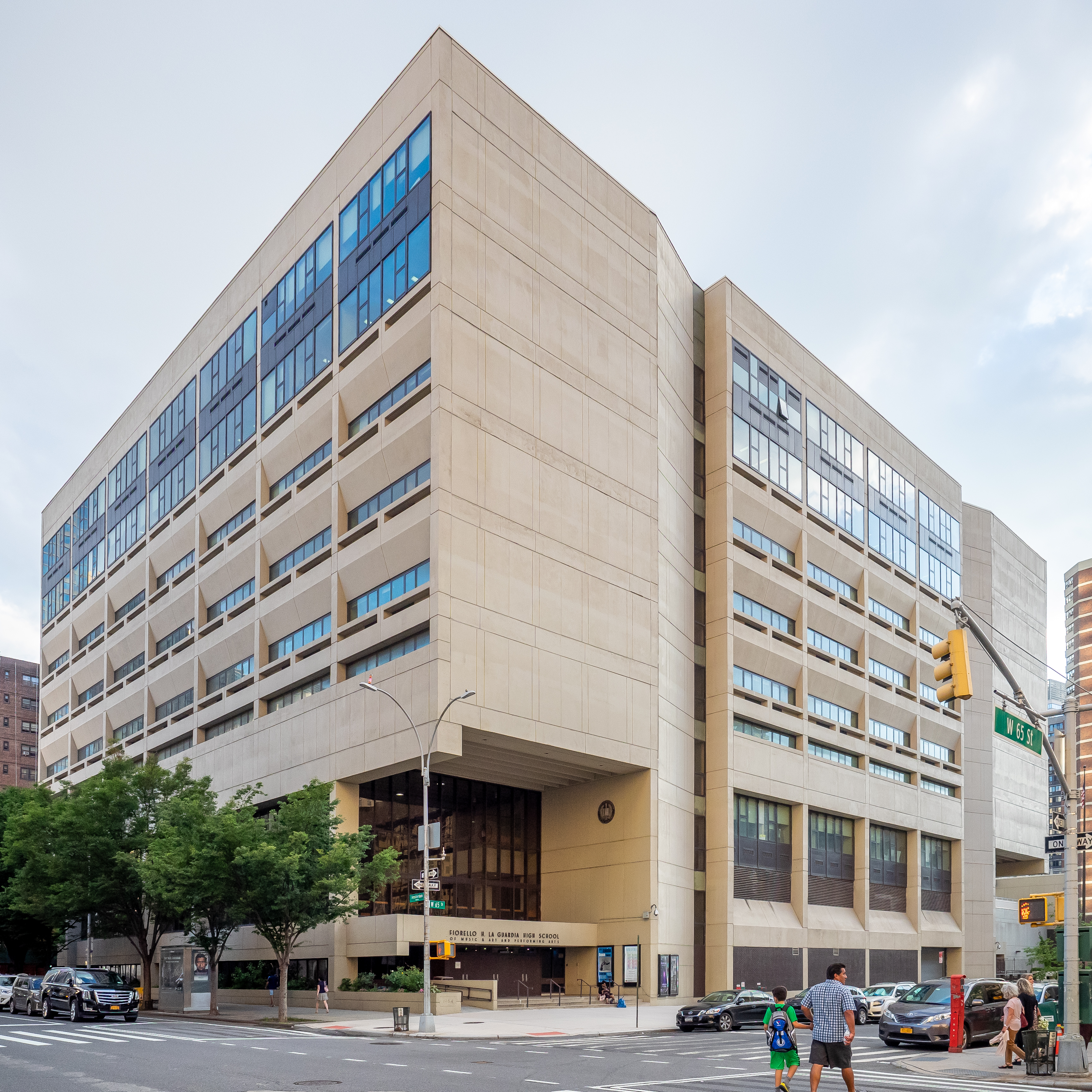
- The exterior of LaGuardia, one block west of Lincoln Center

Location
- 100 Amsterdam Ave; Upper West Side, Manhattan, New York 10023; United States; 40°46′27″N 73°59′08″W

Information
- Type: Public, Selective school
- Established: 1961; 65 years ago
- School district: New York City Geographic District #3
- NCES School ID: 360007804458
- Principal: Deepak Marwah
- Teaching staff: 149.50 (on an FTE basis)
- Grades: 9-12
- Enrollment: 2,141 (2023–2024)
- Student to teacher ratio: 14.32
- Campus: City: Large
- Colors: Red and White
- Website: laguardiahs.org

The Fiorello H. LaGuardia High School of Music and Art and Performing Arts (often referred to simply as LaGuardia or "LaG") is a public high school in the Lincoln Square neighborhood of the Upper West Side in Manhattan, New York City. It specializes in teaching visual arts and performing arts. It is operated by the New York City Department of Education.

Situated at 100 Amsterdam Avenue between West 64th and 65th Streets, near Lincoln Center, the school was created by merging the High School of Music & Art and the School of Performing Arts. The school aims to prepare students for higher education, including conservatory study, and a career in the arts.

The school is the only one of New York City's nine specialized high schools to receive special funding from the New York State Legislature through the Hecht-Calandra Act, as well as the only specialized high school that does not use the Specialized High Schools Admissions Test (SHSAT) as admissions criteria.

The school in 2024–2025 had 2251 students and 153 full-time equivalent staff members, with a teacher–student ratio of 1:14.7.

== History ==
The High School of Music & Art was founded in 1936 by Mayor Fiorello H. LaGuardia, who sought to establish a public school where students could hone their talents in music, art, and the performing arts. Music & Art – colloquially known as "The Castle on the Hill" – was located in Manhattan at Convent Avenue and 135th Street in what has since become part of City College of New York's South Campus; the building is home to A. Philip Randolph Campus High School. LaGuardia regarded Music & Art as the "most hopeful accomplishment" of his 12 years as mayor.

In 1948, a similar institution – the High School of Performing Arts – was created to harness students' talents in dance. It was located on West 46th Street in Midtown Manhattan. The schools merged on paper in 1961, but didn't move to the same building until 1985. The building was designed by Argentine architect Eduardo Catalano and named in honor of LaGuardia. The school is located next to Lincoln Center.

The school's alumni association, which has a full-time executive director and offices at the school, functions as an independent charitable organization organized under the laws of New York. Alumni of LaGuardia and its predecessor schools have endowed scholarships and support for special programs, school events, and reunions held at the school and throughout the world.

== Academic curriculum ==
Students at LaGuardia take a full academic course load while participating in conservatory-style arts concentration. Each student majors in one studio, choosing from either Dance, Drama, Art, Vocal Music, Instrumental Music, or Technical Theater.

Students can take honors classes by choice or programming. LaGuardia also offers several Advanced Placement courses, with 57% of students in at least one AP course. 81% of students attended college directly after graduating.

== Enrollment ==
=== Entrance Audition ===
LaGuardia is open to all New York City residents entering 9th or 10th grade. Admission is based on an audition, which can be done in any of the six departments. Students submit an online audition for whichever category they apply for, and then depending on the subject they may receive a callback for an in-person audition. Students must also have at least a 65 grade in all core subjects.

=== Demographics ===
In the 2024 academic year, there were a total of 2248 students. 39% of students were White, 19% of students were Asian, 17% of students were Hispanic, 11% of students were Black, <1% of students were Native American and <1% of students were Pacific Islander. 71% of LaGuardia students are female.

== Studio curriculum ==
The school presents an annual musical. The Musical Theater class, an elective school-wide course, is offered through the collaboration of faculty members from Music, Drama, Dance, and the Tech Theater Studios, culminating in a major musical theater performance. Productions have included Gypsy, Les Misérables, West Side Story, Hair, Ragtime, Hairspray, Guys and Dolls, Sweet Charity, Grease, In the Heights, Beauty and the Beast, The Sound of Music, and Cinderella.

=== Art ===
For the first two years of education, the art department stresses traditional artistic skills and discipline. Students work on drawing from observation, learning color theory, and the principles of design. Students then choose vocationally oriented courses in the fine arts such as Digital Media, Architecture, Painting, Sculpture, Fashion Design, and Photography. In their senior year, art majors can submit portfolios to the department for consideration for a place in the senior galleries, which are a series of shows organized and constructed by the chosen students and a student curator.

=== Music ===
The music department has two symphony orchestras, five choirs, four string ensembles, two concert bands, two jazz bands, a chamber group, a gospel choir, a show choir, and an opera company with a pit orchestra. Vocal and instrumental students study in a conservatory curriculum with three hours of music per day, including performing ensembles, electives (in areas such as music technology and composition), music theory and history. The department has worked with composers and organizations such as Eric Whitacre, Josh Groban, Arturo O'Farrill, Béla Fleck and NPR's Radiolab.

==== Instrumental programs ====
Every student in the instrumental department must join a performing ensemble and a class specific to their instrument's musicological classification (one of three winds ensembles, three string orchestras or a percussion corps). After completing their first year with an ensemble, students may fulfill the remainder of performance credits with electives.

- The LaGuardia Symphony Orchestra ("Junior Orchestra") was formed to expose students to complex and professional repertoire.
- The LaGuardia Philharmonic ("Senior Orchestra") accepts students through a secondary audition process. It is one of LaGuardia's best-known ensembles.
- Junior Jazz teaches elementary jazz performance and theory.
- Senior Jazz is the school's jazz band.
- Chamber Ensemble
- Symphonic Winds ("Junior Band") was formed as an alternative to the orchestral program, exposing wind, brass, and percussion students to repertoire that features their instruments.
- Winds Symphony ("Senior Band") also requires a secondary audition, and is moving towards work with professional musicians and recording studios.
- Pit Orchestra consists of two ensembles that perform with the annual musical and opera. In 2014, the musical pit orchestra worked with Lin-Manuel Miranda and the cast of In The Heights to workshop their own production of the musical.

==== Vocal programs ====
Every student in the vocal department must perform with Elementary Chorus in their first or second year. At the secondary level, students must perform with either Mixed Chorus or Girls' Chorus. Third-year vocal music majors must complete an additional year of chorus, performing either with Mixed Chorus, Women's Chorus, or Senior Chorus.

- Women's Chorus is an all-female group that is open to third- and fourth-year voice students. It is not audition-based.
- Senior Chorus is a competitive elective class open to juniors and seniors. The ensemble is one of LaGuardia's most well known and has been routinely selected to perform for the American Choral Directors Association.
- Gospel Chorus is an elective open to all students.
- Show Choir is also an elective course that accepts students from any studio.
- Opera Workshop is open to third- and fourth-year vocal majors through audition, where operatic works are analyzed and studied. The opera of choice is performed halfway through the spring semester. In 2011, the Broadway musical team of Laurence O'Keefe and Nell Benjamin announced a musical with LaGuardia's Opera Workshop and Pit Orchestra. The musical, entitled Life of the Party, is a comedy based on Stalinist movie musicals of the Soviet Union. The work ran from May 3 through May 6, 2012.
- Solo Voice teaches operatic solos through private instruction.

==== Musicology programs ====
Every music student must pass an elementary sight-singing course and a year of music theory and history.

- The LaGuardia New Music Ensemble focuses on popular music composition and theory. Students may compose original songs and perform them during school productions. The ensemble grants admission through auditions, in which a portfolio is required.
- Music Technology is a class in music production, electronic music history and computer theory.
- Composition is taught through private instruction

=== Dance ===
The Dance Department is based on pre-conservatory-based training in the field of dance. Students spend the first two years training solely in classical ballet and the combined modern techniques of Graham and Horton. In their junior year, they may take musical theater and tap classes. The junior class performs for the first time junior year. The second semester of junior year, they take a choreography class in which they create pieces of their own to perform. Senior year, the dancers take career-management classes and perform in the Winter Showcase and the Graduation Dance Concert.

Alumni of the program include Desmond Richardson and Suzanne Vega.

== Sports ==
LaGuardia offers 21 sports on the varsity level, most of which compete in the Public School Athletic League (PSAL). Fall season sports include bowling, swimming, volleyball, boys and girls cross country, fencing (co-ed), and soccer. Winter season sports include basketball, gymnastics, and indoor track. In the spring, the school offers baseball, outdoor track, tennis, volleyball (boys), handball, softball, and tennis (girls).

== Representation in other media ==
The 1980 dramatic film Fame was based on student life at the School of Performing Arts before its merger into LaGuardia High School. A television series based on the film, Fame, aired in 1982. It was adapted again as a stage musical, which premiered in 1988. A loose remake of the film was released in 2009.

== Drugs and mental health ==
The school has documented issues with heavy drugs such as opioids and other pharmaceuticals.

Mental health is also a big issue at the school. Students have sometimes struggled with the demanding workload at the school. Other obligations have taken a toll on the mental health of the student body, especially in recent years. The NYCDOE's school snapshot surveys shows that 81% of students at the school say they experienced stress. In the 2019–2020 NYCDOE surveys, 46% of students reported that their teachers support them when they are upset.

== See also ==
- Professional Children's School
- Professional Performing Arts School
- School of American Ballet
- Special Music School
