= Specialized high schools in New York City =

Nine selective public high schools

Within the public school system of New York City, nine specialized high schools serve academically and artistically gifted students. Eight of the schools require the Specialized High Schools Admissions Test (SHSAT) for admission, while Fiorello H. LaGuardia High School requires an audition or portfolio.

== Schools ==
=== Bronx High School of Science ===
Bronx High School of Science was founded in 1938 as a specialized science and math high school for boys, by resolution of the Board of Education of the City of New York, with Morris Meister as the first principal of the school. They were given use of an antiquated Gothic-gargoyled edifice located at Creston Avenue and 184th Street. The building, built in 1918 for Evander Childs High School, had been successively occupied by Walton High School (1930) and by an annex of DeWitt Clinton High School (1935). The initial faculty was comprised in part by a contingent from Stuyvesant High School. Principal Meister put his imprint on the school from its formation, for example, selecting as school colors "green to represent chlorophyll and gold the sun, both of which are essential to the chain of life."

=== Brooklyn Latin School ===
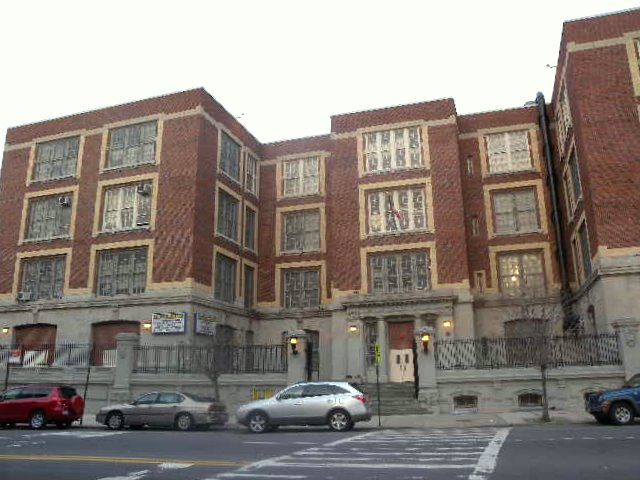
Brooklyn Latin

Unlike nearly all other specialized high schools, Brooklyn Latin has a strong focus on the humanities and classics. All students are required to take four years of English, History, Latin, and a modern foreign language. All classes regularly hold Socratic Seminars, in which students lead roundtable question-and-answer discussions, and all students take part in declamation (public speaking) exercises. Because of its small class size, Brooklyn Latin offers a relatively low student-to-teacher ratio (currently around 16:1). All students are required to take International Baccalaureate courses in junior and senior years.

=== Brooklyn Technical High School ===
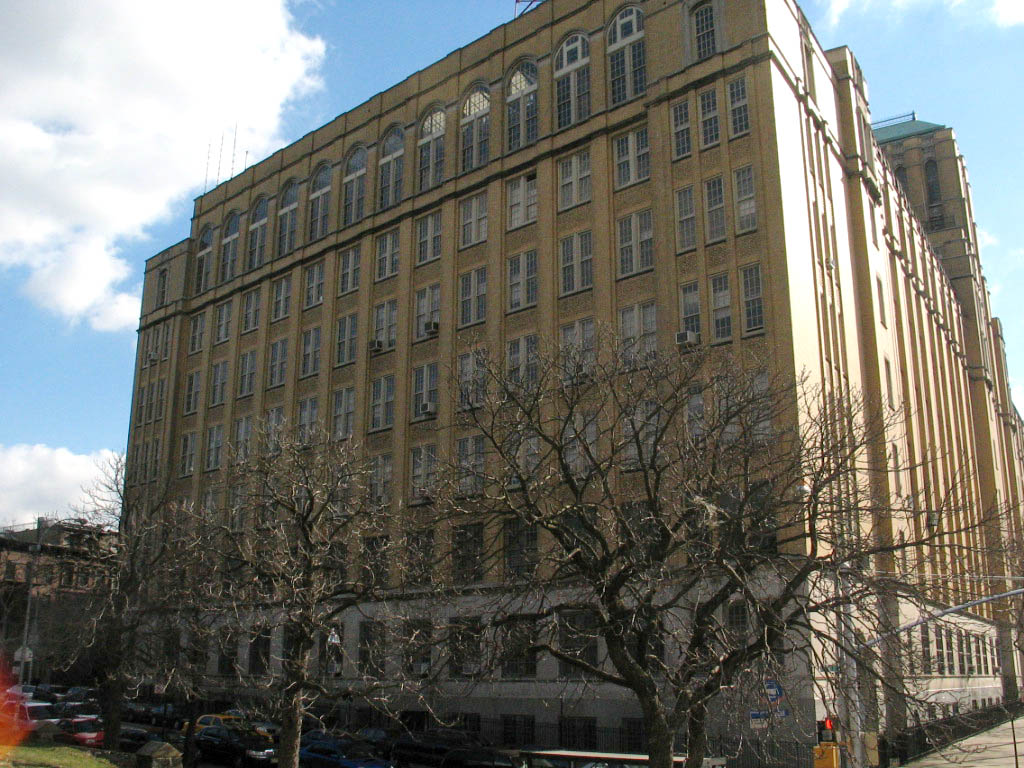
Brooklyn Technical

One of the original three specialized high schools in New York City (the other two being Stuyvesant High School and Bronx High School of Science). In 1918, Dr. Albert L. Colston, chair of the Math Department at Manual Training High School, recommended establishing a technical high school for Brooklyn boys. His plan envisioned a heavy concentration of math, science, and drafting courses with parallel paths leading either to college or to a technical career in industry. By 1922, Dr. Colston's concept was approved by the Board of Education, and Brooklyn Technical High School opened in a converted warehouse at 49 Flatbush Avenue Extension, with 2,400 students. This location, in the shadow of the Manhattan Bridge, is the reason the school seal bears the image of this bridge, rather than the Brooklyn Bridge. Brooklyn Tech would occupy one more location before settling into its current site, for which the groundbreaking was held in 1930.

=== Fiorello H. LaGuardia High School of Music & Art and Performing Arts ===
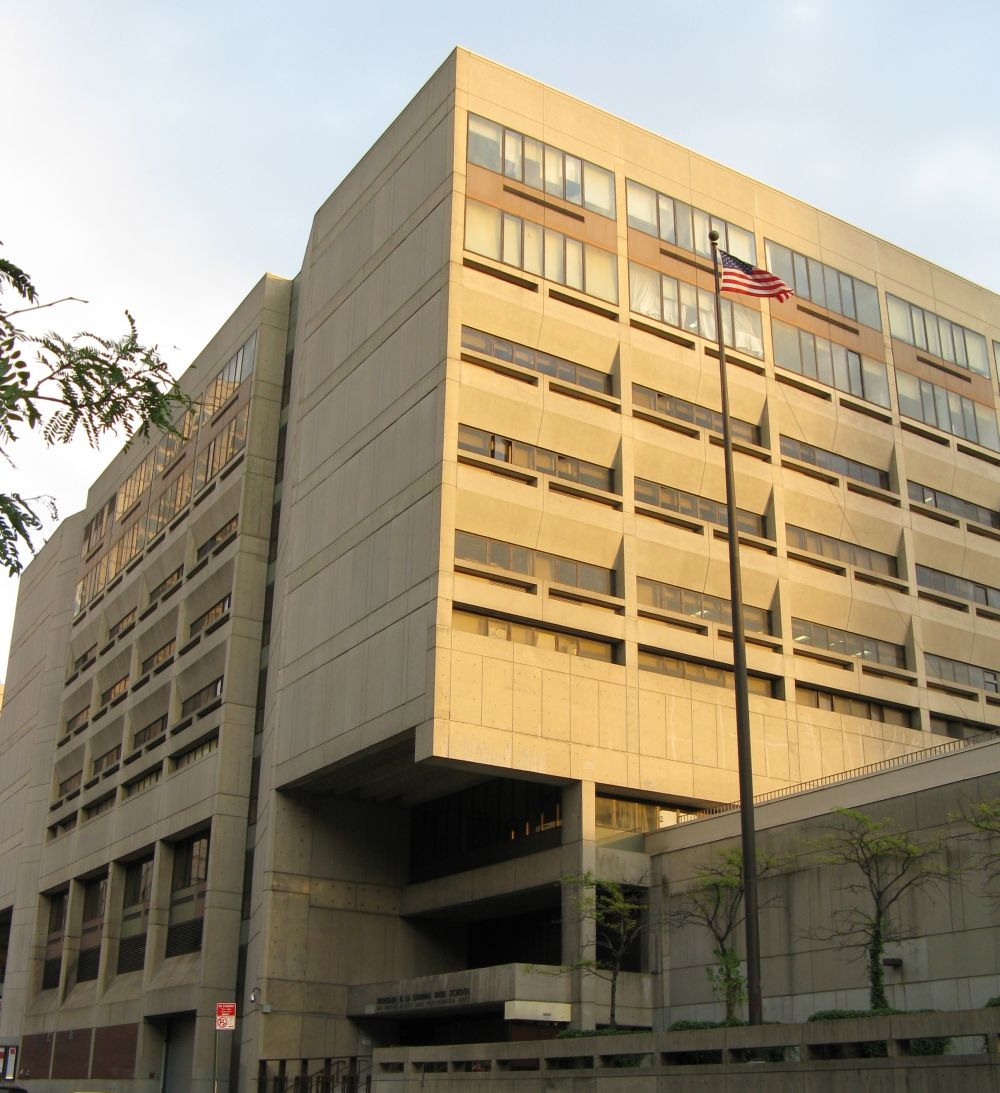
LaGuardia in 2008

Fiorello H. LaGuardia High School is the only specialized high school in New York City that does not require that an applicant take the SHSAT. Rather, students are accepted through auditions in the fields of vocal music, instrumental music, visual arts, dance, drama, and technical theatre.

=== High School for Math, Science and Engineering at City College ===
The High School for Math, Science and Engineering at City College was created in 2002, with an emphasis on engineering. As of 2024, the school is #3 in New York State and #36 in the nation, according to U.S. News & World Report. HSMSE was designed to be a small school with only about five hundred students.

=== High School of American Studies at Lehman College ===
The High School of American Studies at Lehman College is located on the Lehman College campus, in the Bedford Park section of the Bronx. Unlike the rest of the specialized high schools, the American Studies curriculum emphasizes U.S. History, offering three years (as opposed to only one) of AP-level U.S. History. The partnership with the Gilder Lehrman Institute of American History has allowed the school to plan multiple trips outside of New York City, with students paying relatively cheap fees. In 2008, U.S. News & World Report ranked American Studies as the 29th best public high school in the country and 2nd in New York State. In 2009, the school rose to be the 19th best public high school in the country. In 2014, HSAS was ranked #1 in New York State.

=== Queens High School for the Sciences ===
Queens High School for the Sciences building in Jamaica, Queens

The Queens High School for the Sciences (QHSS) was established in 2002 as the Queens High School for the Sciences at York College, one of three specialized high schools created through a partnership between the New York City Department of Education and the City University of New York. The school opened on the campus of York College with approximately 125 ninth-grade students.

QHSS is the only specialized high school located in Queens. In 2024, U.S. News & World Report ranked the school first among high schools in New York State and 25th nationally.

In September 2026, QHSS relocated from York College to a newly constructed school building at 165-18 Hillside Avenue in Jamaica, Queens.

=== Staten Island Technical High School ===
Staten Island Technical High School began in 1982 as an annex of Ralph R. McKee Vocational-Technical High School, located in the New Dorp neighborhood of Staten Island, after New Dorp High School, which had occupied the building since it was built in the 1930s, moved to its current location on New Dorp Lane. The technical courses were taught in the annex, while the vocational courses stayed in St. George. Through the advocacy of parents, staff, and students, Staten Island Tech was made an independent high school by the New York City Board of Education in May 1988. Nicholas M. Bilotti, who had been serving as director of the annex, was appointed principal of the new high school.

=== Stuyvesant High School ===
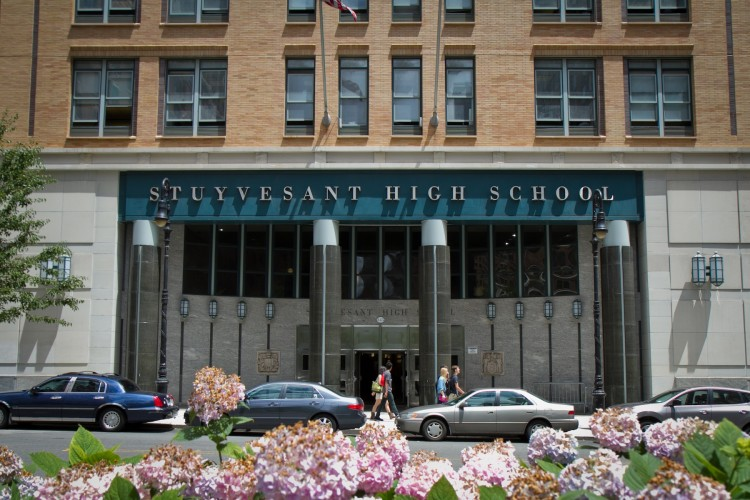
Stuyvesant HS

Stuyvesant High School is named after Peter Stuyvesant, the last Dutch governor of New Netherland before the colony was transferred to England in 1664. Of the nine Specialized high schools, Stuyvesant has the highest score cutoff for entry.

The school was established in 1904 as a manual training school for boys, hosting 155 students and 12 teachers. In 1907, it moved from its original location at 225 East 23rd Street to a building designed by C. B. J. Snyder at 345 East 15th Street, where it remained for 85 years. It moved to its current location, a building on the Hudson River at 345 Chambers Street, in 1992.

== History ==
In 1934, Stuyvesant implemented a system of entrance examinations. The examination was developed with the assistance of Columbia University, and the program was later expanded to include the newly founded Bronx Science and Brooklyn Tech.

Their status as specialized schools was frequently threatened by factions within the New York City school system and government. As a way to preserve their special status, in 1972, the Hecht-Calandra Act was passed by the New York State Legislature, designating these schools as specialized science and math high schools for New York City. The Act called for a uniform exam in math and science to be administered for admission to these schools, in keeping with the uniform examination that had already been required by the New York City Board of Education for admission to these schools. The School of Performing Arts and The High School of Music & Art (consolidated in 1984 into LaGuardia High School) were also designated by the legislature as specialized high schools, and admission was by audition and portfolio rather than examination, in keeping with their artistic mission.

Staten Island Tech began in 1982 as an annex of Ralph R. McKee Vocational-Technical High School and was made an independent high school in May 1988. HSAS, HSMSE, and QHSSYC were opened in 2002. Brooklyn Latin was established in 2006. All of these schools are required by state law to admit students based on the uniform Specialized High Schools Admissions Test, and positions are assigned on a ranked system, depending on the number of seats available and how many applicants requested a given school.

== See also ==
- Empowerment School
- List of high schools in New York City
- Hunter College High School
