= List of public elementary schools in New York City =

This is a list of public elementary schools in New York City. They are typically referred to as "PS number" (e.g., "PS 46", that is, "Public School 46"). Many PS numbers are ambiguous, being used by more than one school. The sections correspond to New York City DOE Regions. Some charter schools are included throughout this list; others may be added to the charter schools section at the end of the list below.

== Manhattan ==
School number	School name	Neighborhood	Building code	Reference
PS 1	Alfred E. Smith	Two Bridges	M001	
PS 6	Lillie Devereaux Blake	Upper East Side		
PS 11	Sarah J. Garnet (Formerly William T. Harris)	Chelsea	M011	
PS 15	Roberto Clemente	East Village	M015	
PS 18	Park Terrace	Inwood	M898	
PS 19	Asher Levy	East Village	Asher Levy	
PS 20	Anna Silver	Lower East Side	Anna Silver	PS 28
PS MS 34	Franklin D. Roosevelt	Lower East Side	Franklin Delano Roosevelt	
PS 41	Greenwich Village School	Greenwich Village	M041	
PS 63	S.T.A.R. Academy (Formerly William McKinley)	Lower East Side		
PS 64	Robert Simon	East Village		
PS 84	Lillian Weber	Upper West Side		
PS 102	Jacques Cartier	East Harlem	M102	
PS 108	School of Authors	East Harlem	M108	
PS 110	Florence Nightingale	Lower East Side	M110	
PS 111	Adolph S. Ochs	Hell's Kitchen	M111	
PS 112	Jose Celso Barbosa	East Harlem	M112	
PS 115	Alexander Humboldt	Washington Heights	M115	
PS 116	Mary Lindley Murray	Kips Bay	M116	
PS 125	Ralph Bunche	Harlem	M125	
PS 126	Jacob August Riis	Two Bridges	M126	
PS 128	Audubon	Washington Heights	M128	
PS 129	John H. Finley	Harlem	M129	
PS 130	Hernando De Soto	Little Italy	M130	
PS 132	Juan Pablo Duarte	Fort George	M132	
PS 134	Henrietta Szold	Lower East Side	M134	
PS 140	Nathan Straus	Lower East Side	M140	
PS 142	Amalia Castro	Lower East Side	M142	
PS 145	The Bloomingdale School	Manhattan Valley	M145	
PS 146	Anna M. Short	East Harlem	M146	
PS 150	Tribeca Learning Center	Tribeca	M840	
PS 152	Dyckman Valley School	Fort George	M152	
PS 153	Adam Clayton Powell	Hamilton Heights	M153	
PS 154	The Harriet Tubman Learning Center	Harlem	M154	
PS 155	William Paca	East Harlem	M115	
PS 158	Bayard Taylor	Upper East Side	M158	
PS 161	Pedro Albizu Campos	West Harlem	M161	
PS 163	Alfred E. Smith	Manhattan Valley	M163	
PS 165	Robert E. Simon	Manhattan Valley	M165	
PS 166	The Richard Rodgers School of the Arts and Technology	Upper West Side	M166	
PS 171	Patrick Henry Preparatory School	East Harlem	M171	
PS 173		Washington Heights	M173	
PS 175	Henry H. Garnet	Harlem	M175	
PS 178	Juan Bosch	Inwood	M178	
PS 180	Hugo Newman	Harlem	M180	
PS 182	The Bilingual Bicultural School	East Harlem	M083	
PS 183	Robert Louis Stevenson	Upper East Side	M183	
PS MS 184	Shuang Wen School	Lower East Side		
PS 185	The Locke School of Arts and Engineering	Harlem	M185	
PS 188	Island School	Lower East Side	M188	
PS 189		Washington Heights	M189	
PS 315	East Village Community	Lower East Side		
PS 361	Children’s Workshop School	Lower East Side	Sister schools with Neighborhood School, East Village Community School, Earth School and Tompkins Square Middle School	
PS 363	Neighborhood School	East Village	Share a building with PS 163 (S.T.A.R. Academy)	
PS 364	Earth School	Lower East Side		
PS 452		Upper West Side		
PS 527	East Side School for Social Action	Yorkville, Manhattan	M527	

== Older classifications ==
=== Region 1: The Bronx ===
School number	School name	Neighborhood	Named for:	References
PS 2	Morrisania	Morrisania		
PS 7	Kingsbridge	Kingsbridge		
PS 8	Isaac Varian	Norwood	Isaac Varian	
PS 9	Ryer Avenue Elementary School	Fordham		
PS 11	Highbridge School	Highbridge		
PS 15	Institute for Environmental Learning	University Heights		
PS 21	Philip Sheridan	Wakefield	Philip Sheridan	
PS 24	Spuyten Duyvil	Spuyten Duyvil		
PS 28	Mount Hope	Mount Hope		
PS 32	Belmont	Belmont		
PS 33	Timothy Dwight	University Heights	Timothy Dwight IV	
PS 37	Multiple Intelligence School	Kingsbridge		
PS 46	Edgar Allan Poe	Fordham	Edgar Allan Poe	
PS 51	Bronx New School	Belmont		
PS 53	Basheer Quisim	Morrisania		
PS/IS 54		Fordham		
PS 55	Benjamin Franklin	Morrisania	Benjamin Franklin	
PS 56	Norwood Heights	Norwood		
PS 58		Morrisania		
PS 59		Fordham		
PS 63	Author’s Academy	Morrisania		
PS 64 (phased out in 2013)	Pura Belpre	Mount Eden	Pura Belpré	
PS 70	Max Schoenfeld	Border of Mount Eden & Mount Hope		
PS 73	Bronx	Highbridge		
PS 79 (closed in 2007)	Creston	Fordham		
PS 81	Robert J. Christen	North Riverdale		
PS 85	Great Expectations	Fordham		
PS 90	George Meany	Concourse	George Meany	
PS 91	Bronx	University Heights		
PS 94	Kings College School	Norwood	Columbia University	
PS 109	Sedgwick	Morris Heights		
PS 110	Theodore Schoenfeld	Morrisania		
PS 126	Dr Marjorie H Dunbar	Highbridge	Marjorie Dunbar	
PS 128	Mott Hall III	Morrisania		
PS 132	Garrett A Morgan	Morrisania	Garrett A. Morgan	
PS 159	Luis Munoz Marin	Fordham	Luis Muñoz Marín	
PS 163	Arthur A Schomburg	Fordham	Arthur Schomburg	
PS 170	Esteban Vicente	Mount Eden	Esteban Vicente	
PS 199X	The Shakespeare School	Mount Eden	William Shakespeare	
PS 204	Morris Heights	Morris Heights		
PS 205	Fiorello LaGuardia	Belmont	Fiorello H. LaGuardia	
P/IS 218	Rafael Hernandez Dual Language	Concourse	Rafael Hernández Marín	
PS 236	Langston Hughes	Mount Hope	Langston Hughes	
PS 246	Poe Center	Fordham	Edgar Allan Poe	
PS 294	The Walton Avenue School	Mount Eden		
PS 306		Morris Heights		
PS 307	Luisa Pineiro Fuentes School of Science and Discovery	Kingsbridge		
PS 310	Marble Hill	Marble Hill		
PS 315	Lab School	Fordham		
PS 396		University Heights		

=== Region 2: The Bronx ===
School number	School name	Neighborhood	Named for:	References
PS 6	West Farms	West Farms		
PS 16		Washingtonville		
PS 19	Judith K. Weiss	Woodlawn		
PS 21	Phillip H Sheridan	Wakefield	Gen. Philip Sheridan	
PS 36	Unionport	Unionport		
PS 41	Gun Hill Road	Olinville		
PS 44	David C Farragut	Fairmount	Adm. David Farragut	
PS 47	John Randolph	Soundview		
PS 48	Joseph R Drake	Hunts Point	Joseph Rodman Drake	
PS 50	Clara Barton	East Morrisania	Clara Barton	
PS 57	Crescent	East Tremont		
PS 61	Francisco Oller	East Morrisania	Francisco Oller	
PS 62	Inocensio Casanova	Longwood		
PS 67	Mohegan School	East Tremont		
PS 68	Bronx	Edenwald		
PS 72	Dr William Dorney	Throgs Neck		
PS 75		Longwood		
PS 76	The Bennington School	Allerton		
PS 78	Anne Hutchinson	Williamsbridge	Anne Hutchinson	
PS 83	Donald Hertz	Morris Park		
PS 87	Bronx	Wakefield		
PS 92	Bronx	Tremont		
PS 93	Albert G. Oliver	Soundview		
PS 96	Richard Rodgers	Allerton	Richard Rodgers	
PS 97	Bronx	Pelham Gardens		
PS 100	Isaac Clason	Soundview	Isaac Clason (See Clason's Point, Bronx)	
PS 102	Joseph O Loretan	Park Versailles		
PS 105	Senator Abraham Bernstein	Bronxdale	Abraham Bernstein (politician)	
PS 106	Parkchester	Unionport		
PS 107		Soundview		
PS 108	Philip J Abinanti	Morris Park		
PS 111	Seton Falls	Edenwald		
PS 112	Bronxwood	Edenwald		
PS 119		Unionport		
PS 130	Abram Stevens Hewitt	Longwood	Abram Stevens Hewitt	
PS 134	George F Bristow	East Morrisania	George Frederick Bristow	
PS 138	Samuel Randall	Castle Hill		
PS 140	Eagle	Longwood		
PS 146	Edward Collins	Longwood		
PS 150	Charles James Fox	Longwood		
PS 152	Evergreen	Soundview		
PS 153	Helen Keller	Co-Op City	Helen Keller	
PS 160	Walt Disney	Co-Op City	Walt Disney	
PS 178	Dr Selman Waksman	Co-Op City	Dr. Selman Waksman	
PS 182		Clason Point		
PS 194	Countee Cullen	Westchester/Zerega	Countee Cullen	
PS 195		Parkchester		
PS 196		Parkchester		
PS 197		Soundview		
PS 198		Morrisania		
PS 211		Fairmount		
PS 212		Soundview		
PS 214	Lorraine Hansberry	West Farms	Lorraine Hansberry	
	The School of Science and Applied Learning	Tremont		
PS 304	Early Childhood School	Throggs Neck		
	New School #1 @ PS 60			
	New School #2 @ PS 60			
	Bronx Little School	Park Versailles		

=== Region 3: Queens ===
School number	School name	Neighborhood	Named for:	References
PS 11	Kathryn Phelan	Woodside	Kathryn Phelan	
PS 12	James B. Colgate	Woodside	James B. Colgate	
PS 13	Clement C. Moore	Elmhurst	Clement C. Moore	
PS 15	Jackie Robinson	St. Albans	Jackie Robinson	
PS 18	Winchester	Bellerose		
PS 20	John Bowne	Flushing	John Bowne	
PS 21	Edward Hart	Linden Hill	Edward Hart	
PS 22	Thomas Jefferson	Flushing	Thomas Jefferson	
PS 24	Andrew Jackson	Flushing	Andrew Jackson	
PS 26	Rufus King	Fresh Meadows	Rufus King	
PS 29	John M. Harrigan	College Point		
PS 30	Ruby S. Couche	Rochdale Village, Jamaica	Ruby S. Couche, national president of the professional educators' sorority Phi Delta Kappa. She was chosen by Ebony magazine as one of its "100 Most Influential Black Americans" in 1982.	
PS 31	Bayside	Bayside		
PS 32	State Street	Flushing		
PS 33	Edward M. Funk	Queens Village	Edward M. Funk, a retired principal of the school who was murdered by a group of teenagers who were attempting to steal his car	
PS 34	John Harvard	Queens Village	John Harvard	
PS 35	Nathaniel Woodhull	Hollis	Nathaniel Woodhull, first U.S. General killed in the American Revolutionary War, General Woodhull was herding the cattle from the British, and was captured and wounded 5 blocks from the school, at what is now 197th Street and Jamaica Ave. An historical sign marks the location on Jamaica Ave.	
PS 36	St. Albans School	St. Albans	St. Albans, the neighborhood where the school is located	
PS 37	Cynthia Jenkins School	Jamaica	Cynthia Jenkins	
PS 38	Rosedale School	Rosedale	Rosedale, the neighborhood where the school is located	
PS 40	Samuel Huntington	South Jamaica	Samuel Huntington	
PS 41	Crocheron	Bayside	Jacob Crocheron (August 23, 1774 – December 27, 1849) was a U.S. Representative from New York.	
PS 46	Alley Pond	Oakland Gardens	Alley Pond Park	
PS 48	William Wordsworth	Jamaica	William Wordsworth	
PS 49	Dorothy Bonawit Kole	Middle Village	Dorothy Bonawit Kole	
PS 50	Talfourd Lawn Elementary School	Briarwood		
PS 54	Hillside	Hillside		
PS 55	Maure	South Richmond Hill		
PS 79	Francis Lewis	Whitestone	Francis Lewis (March 21, 1713 – December 30, 1803) was a signer of the United States Declaration of Independence as a representative of New York. He moved to Whitestone, New York in 1734.	
PS 80	Thurgood Marshall Magnet	Jamaica	Thurgood Marshall	
PS 82	Hammond	Briarwood		
PS/IS 87	Middle Village	Middle Village		
PS 88	Seneca	Ridgewood		
PS 91	Richard Arkwright	Glendale	Richard Arkwright	
PS 94	David D. Porter	Little Neck	David Dixon Porter	
PS 95	Eastwood School	Jamaica		
PS 98	The Douglaston School	Douglaston	Douglaston, the neighborhood in which the school is located	
PS 99	Kew Gardens	Kew Gardens		
PS 101	School in the Gardens	Forest Hills	The school's name is a reference to the school's location in Forest Hills Gardens.	
PS 107	Thomas A. Dooley	Flushing	Dr. Thomas Anthony Dooley III	
PS/IS 113	Anthony J. Pranzo	Glendale		
PS 115	Glen Oaks	Floral Park, Queens	Glen Oaks is an adjacent neighborhood partially served by the school.	
PS 117	J.Keld/Briarwood School	Briarwood	Joyce Keld	
PS 118	Lorraine Hansberry	St. Albans	Lorraine Hansberry	
PS 120	Queens	Flushing		
PS 121	Nelson A Rockefeller	Richmond Hill		
PS 122	Mamie Fay	Astoria	The Mamie Fay School	
PS 128	Juniper Valley & Lorraine Tuzzo	Middle Village	Lorraine Tuzzo	
PS 129	Patricia Larkin	College Point	Patricia Larkin	
PS 130	Hernando De Soto	Bayside		
PS 131	Abigail Adams	Jamaica	Abigail Adams	
PS 132	Ralph Bunche	Springfield Gardens	Ralph Bunche	
PS 133	-	Bellerose		
PS 134	The Langston Hughes School	Hollis	Langston Hughes	
PS 135	The Bellaire School	Queens Village		
PS 136	Roy Wilkins	Hollis	Roy Wilkins	
PS 138	The Sunrise School	Rosedale	Sunrise Highway	
PS 139	Rego Park	Rego Park		
PS 140	Edward K. Ellington	Addisleigh Park	Duke Ellington	
PS 144	Col. Jeromus Remsen School	Forest Hills		
PS 147	Ronald McNair	Cambria Heights	Ronald McNair	
PS 153	Maspeth Elementary	Maspeth		
PS 154	Harriet Tubman	Fresh Meadows		
PS 159	Isaac Pitkin	Bayside		
PS 160	Walter Francis Bishop	Briarwood	Walter Francis Bishop	
PS 161	Arthur Ashe School	South Richmond Hill	Arthur Ashe	
PS 162	John Golden	Bayside	John Golden	
PS 163	Flushing Heights	Fresh Meadows		
PS 165	Edith K. Bergtraum	Kew Gardens Hills		
PS 169	Bay Terrace	Bayside		
PS 173	The Fresh Meadows School	Fresh Meadows	Fresh Meadows, the neighborhood where the school is located	
PS 174	William Sidney Mount	Rego Park	William Sidney Mount	
PS 175	The Lynn Gross Discovery School	Forest Hills		
PS 176	The Cambria Heights School	Cambria Heights		
PS 178	Professor Juan Bosch	Holliswood		
PS 181	Brookfield	Brookfield		
PS 182	Samantha Smith	Jamaica	Samantha Smith	
PS 184	Flushing Manor	Flushing		
PS 186	Castlewood	Glen Oaks		
PS 188	Kingsbury	Oakland Gardens		
PS 191	Mayflower	Floral Park		
PS 193	Alfred J. Kennedy	Whitestone	Alfred J. Kennedy	
PS 195	William Haberle School	Rosedale	William Haberle	
PS 196	Grand Central Parkway	Forest Hills	Grand Central Parkway, a parkway the school is close to.	
PS 200	Pomonok	Flushing	Pomonok, the neighborhood where the school is located	
PS 201	Magnet School	Kissena		
PS 203	Oakland Gardens	Bayside	Oakland Gardens, the neighborhood where the school is located	
PS 205	Alexander Graham Bell	Oakland Gardens	Alexander Graham Bell	
PS 206	Horace Harding	Rego Park		
PS/IS 208	Elsa Ebeling	Bellerose		
PS 209	Clearview Gardens	Clearview Gardens		
PS 213	The Carl Ullman School	Bayside	Carl Ullman	
PS 214	Cadwallader Colden	Flushing		
PS 220	Edward Mandel	Forest Hills	Edward Mandel	
PS 221	North Hills	Douglaston		
PS 242	Leonard P. Stavisky Early Childhood School	Flushing	Leonard P. Stavisky	
PS 244	Active Learning (EEC)	Kew Gardens Hills		
PS 251	Paerdegat	Queens		
PS/IS 266	-	Bellerose		
PS/IS 270	Gordon Parks	Rosedale	Gordon Parks	
PS 305	Learners & Leaders (EEC)	Ridgewood		
PS 360		St. Albans		

=== Region 4: Queens ===
School number	School name	Neighborhood	Named for:	References
PS 2	Alfred Zimberg	Astoria		
PS 7	Louis F. Simeone	Elmhurst		
PS 11	Kathryn Phelan	Woodside		
PS 12	James B. Colgate	Woodside	James B. Colgate	
PS 13	Clement C. Moore	Elmhurst	Clement Clarke Moore	
PS 14	Fairview	Corona		
PS 16	Nancy DeBenedittis	Corona		
PS 17	Henry David Thoreau	Astoria	Henry David Thoreau	
PS 19	Marino Jeantet	Jackson Heights		
PS 28	The Thomas Emanuel Early Childhood Center	Corona		
PS 58	School of Heroes	Maspeth		
PS 68	Cambridge	Glendale		
PS 69	Jackson Heights	Jackson Heights	Jackson Heights, the neighborhood where the school is located	
PS 70	Queens	Astoria	Joe Petrosino	
PS 71	Forest	Ridgewood		
PS 76	William Hallet	Long Island City		
PS/IS 78	Robert F. Wagner Jr.	Long Island City	Robert F. Wagner Jr.	
PS 81	Jean Paul Richter	Ridgewood		
PS 84	Steinway	Astoria		
PS 85	The Judge Charles J. Vallone School	Astoria		
PS 86	The Irvington	Jamaica Hills		
PS 88	Seneca	Ridgewood		
PS 89	Elmhurst	Elmhurst	Elmhurst, the neighborhood where the school is located	
PS 91	Richard Arkwright	Glendale		
PS 92	Harry T. Stewart Sr.	Jackson Heights		
PS 102	Bayview	Elmhurst		
PS 106	Edward Everett Hale	Edgemere		
PS 111	Jacob Blackwell	Long Island City	Jacob Blackwell	
PS 112	Dutch Kills	Long Island City		
PS 113	Isaac Chauncey	Glendale		
PS 116	Elizabeth L. Farrell	Jamaica		
PS 123	Suydam	Jamaica		
PS 128	Juniper Valley	Middle Village	Juniper Valley Park	
PS 143	Louis Armstrong	Corona	Louis Armstrong	
PS 148	Queens	East Elmhurst		
PS 149	Christa McAuliffe	Jackson Heights	Christa McAuliffe	
PS 150	Queens	Sunnyside		
PS 151	Mary D Carter	Astoria		
PS 152	Gwendolyn Alleyne	Woodside		
PS 153	Maspeth Elem	Maspeth	Maspeth, the neighborhood where the school is located	
PS 166	Henry Gradstein	Astoria	Henry Gradstein	
PS 171	Peter G. Van Alst	Astoria		
PS 199	Maurice A. Fitzgerald	Sunnyside	Maurice A. FitzGerald	
PS 212	School of Cyberscience and Literacy	Jackson Heights		
PS 222	F F Christopher A. Santora School	Jackson Heights		
PS 229	Emmanuel Kaplan	Maspeth	Emmanuel Kaplan, first principal of the school	
PS 234		Astoria		
PS 239	P.O. Ramon Suarez	Ridgewood		

=== Region 5: Brooklyn, Queens ===
School number	School name	Neighborhood	Named for:	References
PS 7	Abraham Lincoln	Cypress Hills, Brooklyn	Abraham Lincoln	
PS 13	Roberto Clemente	East New York, Brooklyn	Roberto Clemente	
PS 41	Francis White School	Brownsville, Brooklyn		
PS 42	Robert Vernam	Arverne, Queens		
PS 43		Far Rockaway, Queens		
PS 45	Clarence Witherspoon	Jamaica, Queens		
PS 47	Chris Galas School	Broad Channel, Queens		
PS 51		Richmond Hill, Queens		
PS 56	Harry Eichler	Richmond Hill, Queens		
PS 60	The Woodhaven School	Woodhaven, Queens		
PS 62	Chester Park School	Richmond Hill, Queens		
PS 63	Old South School	Ozone Park, Queens		
PS 64	Joseph P. Addabbo	Ozone Park, Queens	Joseph Addabbo	
PS 65	The Little Red School House	Cypress Hills, Brooklyn		
PS 65	The Raymond York Elementary School	Ozone Park, Queens	Raymond York	
PS 66	Jacqueline Kennedy Onassis	Richmond Hill, Queens	Jacqueline Kennedy	
PS 72	Annette P. Goldman	East New York, Brooklyn		
PS 89	Cypress Hills	Cypress Hills, Brooklyn		
PS 90	Edna Cohen School	Coney Island, Brooklyn	Edna Cohen	
PS 96		South Ozone Park, Queens		
PS 97	Forest Park School	Woodhaven, Queens		
PS 100	Glen Morris	South Ozone Park, Queens		
PS 104	The Bays Water	Far Rockaway, Queens		
PS 105	The Bay School	Far Rockaway, Queens		
PS 106		Far Rockaway, Queens		
PS 108	Captain Vincent G. Fowler	South Ozone Park, Queens	Fire Capt. Vincent Fowler	
PS 108	Sal Abbracciamento	Cypress Hills, Brooklyn		
PS 114	Belle Harbor School	Belle Harbor, Queens		
PS 123		Jamaica, Queens		
PS 124	Osmond A Church School	South Ozone Park, Queens		
PS 146	Howard Beach	Howard Beach		
PS 149	Danny Kaye School	East New York, Brooklyn	Danny Kaye	
PS 150	Christopher School	Brownsville, Brooklyn		
PS 155		South Ozone Park, Queens		
PS 156	Waverly School	Brownsville, Brooklyn		
PS 158	Warwick School	East New York, Brooklyn		
PS 159	Isaac Pitkin School	East New York, Brooklyn		
PS 165	Ida Posner School	Brownsville, Brooklyn		
PS 174	Dumont School	East New York, Brooklyn		
PS 183	Dr. Richard Green	Rockaway Park, Queens		
PS 183	Daniel Chappie James School	Brownsville, Brooklyn	Daniel Chappie James	
PS 184	Newport	Brownsville, Brooklyn		
PS 188	Michael E. Berdy	Coney Island, Brooklyn		
PS 190	Sheffield School	East New York, Brooklyn		
PS 197	The Ocean School	Far Rockaway, Queens		
PS 202	Ernest S Jenkyns School	East New York, Brooklyn		
PS 207	Rockaway Park	Rockwood Park, Queens		
PS 213	New Lots	East New York, Brooklyn		
PS 214	Michael Friedsam School	Cypress Hills, Brooklyn	Michael Friedsam	
PS 215	Lucretia Mott	Far Rockaway, Queens	Lucretia Mott	
PS 223	Lyndon B. Johnson	Jamaica, Queens	Lyndon B. Johnson	
PS 224	Hale A. Woodruff School	East New York, Brooklyn	Hale Woodruff	
PS 225	Seaside School	Rockaway Park, Queens		
PS 232	Lindenwood	Lindenwood/Howard Beach, Queens		
PS 253		Far Rockaway, Queens		
PS 254	The Rosa Parks School	Richmond Hill, Queens	Rosa Parks	
PS 260	Breuckelen School	Spring Creek, Brooklyn		
PS 273	Wortman School	East New York, Brooklyn		
PS 284	Lew Wallace school	Brownsville, Brooklyn	Lew Wallace	
PS 290	Geraldine A. Ferraro Campus	Cypress Hills, Brooklyn	Geraldine A. Ferraro	
PS 298	Dr. Betty Shabazz	Brownsville, Brooklyn	Betty Shabazz	
PS 306	Ethan Allen	East New York, Brooklyn	Ethan Allen	
PS 323		Brownsville, Brooklyn		
PS 327	Dr. Rose B. English School	Brownsville, Brooklyn	Dr. Rose B. English	
PS 328	Phyllis Wheatley School	East New York, Brooklyn	Phyllis Wheatley	
PS 332/PS 401	Charles H. Houston	Brownsville, Brooklyn	Charles Houston	
PS 345	Patrolman Robert Bolden	East New York, Brooklyn	Robert Bolden	
PS 346	Abe Stark	East New York, Brooklyn	Abe Stark	
	Achievement First East New York School	East New York, Brooklyn		
	East New York Preparatory Charter School	East New York, Brooklyn		
	Peninsula Preparatory Academy Charter School (PPA)	Far Rockaway, Queens		
	Uft Charter School	East New York, Brooklyn		

=== Region 6: Brooklyn ===
School number	School name	Neighborhood	Named for:	References
PS 6	Norma Adams Clemens Academy	Flatbush		
PS 12	Ronald Edmonds Learning Center II	Crown Heights	Ronald Edmonds	
PS 705	Brooklyn Arts and Science Elementary	Crown Heights		
PS 52	Sheepshead Bay	Sheepshead Bay		
PS 91	The Albany Avenue School	Crown Heights/East Flatbush		
PS 92	Adrian Hegeman	Prospect Lefferts Gardens		
PS 114	Ryder Elementary	Canarsie		
PS 119	Amersfort	Flatlands		
PS 135	Sheldon A. Brookner	East Flatbush		
PS 136	School of Science & Technology			
PS 167	The Parkway	Crown Heights		
PS 178	St. Clair McKelway School	Crown Heights	St. Clair McKelway	
PS 191	Paul Robeson	Crown Heights	Paul Robeson	
PS 193	Gil Hodges	Midwood	Gil Hodges	
PS 194	Raoul Wallenberg	Sheepshead Bay	Raoul Wallenberg	
PS 195	Manhattan Beach	Manhattan Beach		
PS 197	Brooklyn	Midwood		
PS 198	Brooklyn	East Flatbush		
PS 203	Floyd Bennett	Flatlands	Floyd Bennett	
PS 206	Joseph F. Lamb	Sheepshead Bay	Joseph F. Lamb	
PS 207	Elizabeth G. Leary	Marine Park		
PS 208	Elsa Ebeling	East Flatbush		
PS 217	Colonel David Marcus School	Ditmas Park	David Marcus	
PS 219	Kennedy-King	East Flatbush		
PS 221	Tossaint L’Ouverture [sic]	Crown Heights	Toussaint L’Ouverture	
PS 222	Katherine R. Snyder	Marine Park		
PS 233	Langston Hughes	East Flatbush	Langston Hughes	
PS 236	Mill Basin	Mill Basin		
PS 241	Emma L. Johnston	Crown Heights		
PS 244	Richard R Green	East Flatbush	Richard R. Green	
PS 245		Flatbush		
PS 249	The Caton	Flatbush		
PS 251	Paedergat	Flatlands		
PS 254	Dag Hammarskjöld	Sheepshead Bay	Dag Hammarskjöld	
PS 255	Barbara Reing School	Sheepshead Bay		
PS 268	Emma Lazarus	East Flatbush	Emma Lazarus	
PS 269	Nostrand	Flatbush	Nostrand Avenue	
PS 272	Curtis Estabrook	Canarsie		
PS 276	Louis Marshall	Canarsie	Louis Marshall	
PS 277	Gerritsen Beach	Gerritsen Beach		
PS 289	George V. Brower	Crown Heights		
PS 312	Bergen Beach	Bergen Beach		
PS 316	Elijah Stroud	Crown Heights		
PS 326		Flatlands		
PS 335	Granville T. Woods	Crown Heights	Granville T. Woods	
PS 361		East Flatbush		
PS 375	Jackie-Robinson School	Crown Heights	Jackie Robinson	
PS 397	Foster-Laurie	Prospect Lefferts Gardens		
PS 398	Walter Weaver	East Flatbush		

=== Region 7: Staten Island, Brooklyn ===
School number	School name	Neighborhood	Named for:	References
PS 1	The Bergen	Sunset Park		
PS 1	Tottenville School	Tottenville	Tottenville, Staten Island	
PS 3	Margaret Gioiosa School	Pleasant Plains		
PS 4	Maurice Wollin School	Arden Heights		
PS 5	Huguenot School	Huguenot	Huguenot, Staten Island	
PS 6	Cpl. Allan F. Kivlehan School	Richmond Valley		
PS 8	Shirlee Solomon School	Great Kills		
PS 11	Thomas Dongan School	Dongan Hills	Thomas Dongan, 2nd Earl of Limerick	
PS 13	M. L. Lindenmeyer School	Rosebank		
PS 14	Cornelius Vanderbilt School	Stapleton	Cornelius Vanderbilt	
PS 16	John J. Driscoll School	Tompkinsville		
PS 18	John G. Whittier School	West Brighton	John Greenleaf Whittier	
PS 19	Curtis School	West Brighton		
PS 20	Port Richmond School	Port Richmond	Port Richmond, Staten Island	
PS 21	Margaret Emery-Elm Park	Port Richmond		
PS 22	Graniteville School	Graniteville	Graniteville, Staten Island	
PS 23	Richmondtown School	Richmondtown	Richmondtown, Staten Island	
PS 26	Carteret School	Travis		
PS 29	Bardwell School	Castleton Corners		
PS 30	Westerleigh School	Westerleigh	Westerleigh, Staten Island	
PS 31	William T. Davis School	New Brighton	William T. Davis	
PS 35	Clove Valley School	Sunnyside		
PS 36	J. C. Drumgoole School	Annadale	John Christopher Drumgoole	
PS 38	George Cromwell School	Midland Beach	George Cromwell	
PS 39	Francis J. Murphy Jr. School	South Beach		
PS 41	New Dorp School	New Dorp	New Dorp, Staten Island	
PS 42	Eltingville School	Eltingville	Eltingville, Staten Island	
PS 44	Thomas C. Brown School	Mariners Harbor	Thomas C. Brown	
PS 45	John Tyler School	West Brighton	John Tyler	
PS 46	Albert V. Maniscalco School	South Beach	Albert V. Maniscalco	
PS 48	Mapleton School	Mapleton	Mapleton, Brooklyn	
PS 48	William G. Wilcox School	Concord		
PS 50	Frank Hankinson School	Oakwood	Frank Hankinson	
PS 52	John C. Thompson School	Dongan Hills		
PS 53	Bay Terrace School	Bay Terrace	Bay Terrace, Staten Island	
PS 54	Charles W. Leng School	Willowbrook	Charles W. Leng	
PS 55	Henry M. Boehm School	Eltingville		
PS 56	Louis Desario School	Rossville		
PS 57	Hubert H. Humphrey School	Clifton	Hubert Humphrey	
PS 58	Space Shuttle Columbia School	New Springville	Space Shuttle Columbia	
PS 60	Alice Austen School	Graniteville	Alice Austen	
PS 69	Daniel D. Tompkins School	Heartland Village	Daniel D. Tompkins	
PS 69	Vincent D. Grippo School	Borough Park		
PS 94	The Henry Longfellow	Sunset Park	Henry Wadsworth Longfellow	
PS 97	The Highlawn	Gravesend		
PS 99	The Isaac Asimov School for Science and Literature	Midwood	Isaac Asimov	
PS 100	The Coney Island School	Brighton Beach		
PS 101	The Verrazano	Gravesend	Giovanni da Verrazzano	
PS 102	The Bayview	Bay Ridge		
PS 105	The Blythebourne School	Borough Park		
PS 112	Lefferts Park	Bensonhurst		
PS 127	McKinley Park	Dyker Heights		
PS 128	Bensonhurst	Bensonhurst		
PS 153	Homecrest	Sheepshead Bay		
PS 160	William T. Sampson School	Borough Park	William T. Sampson	
PS 163	Bath Beach School	Bath Beach	Bath Beach, Brooklyn	
PS 164	Caesar Rodney School	Borough Park	Caesar Rodney	
PS 170	Lexington	Bay Ridge		
PS 176	Ovington	Dyker Heights		
PS 177	The Marlboro	Gravesend		
PS 179	Kensington	Kensington		
PS 180	Homewood	Borough Park		
PS 185	Walter Kassenbrock	Fort Hamilton		
PS 186	Dr. Irving A. Gladstone	Bensonhurst		
PS 192	Brooklyn	Borough Park		
PS 199	Frederick Wachtel	Midwood		
PS 200	Benson School	Bath Beach		
PS 204	Vince Lombardi	Bensonhurst	Vince Lombardi	
PS 205	Clarion	Bensonhurst		
PS 212	Lady Deborah Moody	Bath Beach	Deborah Moody	
PS 215	Morris H. Weiss	Gravesend	Morris H. Weiss	
PS 216	Arturo Toscanini	Gravesend	Arturo Toscanini	
PS 225	Eileen E. Zaglin	Brighton Beach	Eileen E. Zaglin	
PS 229	Dyker	Bath Beach		
PS 247	New York City College Partnership	Bensonhurst		
PS 253	Ezra Jack Keats International School	Brighton Beach	Ezra Jack Keats	
PS 329	Surfside			
PS 506	School of Journalism & Technology	Sunset Park		
PS 861	Staten Island School of Civic Leadership	Graniteville		

=== Region 8: Brooklyn ===
School number	School name	Neighborhood	Named for:	References
PS 3	The Bedford Village	Bedford		
PS 5	Dr. Ronald McNair	Bedford-Stuyvesant	Ronald McNair	
PS 8	Emily Warren Roebling (was Robert Fulton)	Brooklyn Heights	Emily Warren Roebling	
PS 9	Sarah Smith Garnet	Prospect Heights	Sarah Smith Garnet (formerly named for Teunis G. Bergen)	
PS 10	Magnet School for Science & Technology	South Slope		
PS 11	Purvis J. Behan	Clinton Hill		
PS 15	Patrick F. Daly	Red Hook		
PS 16	Leonard Dunkly	Williamsburg		
PS 17	Henry D. Woodworth	Williamsburg	Henry D. Woodworth	
PS 18	Edward Bush	Williamsburg		
PS 19	Roberto Clemente	Williamsburg	Roberto Clemente	
PS 20	Clinton Hill	Clinton Hill		
PS 23	Carter G. Woodson	Bedford-Stuyvesant	Carter G. Woodson	
PS 26	Jesse Owens	Bedford-Stuyvesant	Jesse Owens	
PS 28	The Warren	Bedford-Stuyvesant		
PS 31	Samuel F. Du Pont	Greenpoint	Samuel F. Du Pont	
PS 32	Samuels Mills Sprole	Gowanus		
PS 34	Oliver H. Perry	Greenpoint	Oliver Hazard Perry	
PS 38	The Pacific	Boerum Hill		
PS 39	Henry Bristow	Park Slope	Henry Bristow	
PS 40	George W. Carver	Bedford-Stuyvesant	George Washington Carver	
PS 44	Marcus Garvey	Bedford-Stuyvesant	Marcus Garvey	
PS 45	Horace E. Greene	Bushwick		
PS 46	Edward C. Blum	Fort Greene		
PS 54	Samuel C. Barnes	Bedford-Stuyvesant		
PS 56	Lewis H. Latimer	Bedford-Stuyvesant	Lewis H. Latimer	
PS 58	The Carroll School	Carroll Gardens		
PS 59	William Floyd	Bedford-Stuyvesant	William Floyd	
PS 67	Charles A. Dorsey	Fort Greene		
PS 73	Thomas S Boyland School	Bedford-Stuyvesant	Thomas S. Boyland	
PS 75	Mayda Cortiella	Bushwick		
PS 81	Thaddeus Stevens	Bedford-Stuyvesant	Thaddeus Stevens	
PS 84	Jose de Diego	Williamsburg	José de Diego	
PS 93	William H. Prescott	Bedford-Stuyvesant	William H. Prescott	
PS 107	John W. Kimball	South Slope	John W. Kimball	
PS 110	The Monitor	Greenpoint		
PS 120	Carlos Tapia	Bushwick	Carlos Tapia, early 20th-century New York City-based Puerto Rican activist	
PS 124	Silas B. Dutcher	South Slope	Silas Belden Dutcher	
PS 130	The Parkside	Windsor Terrace		
PS 131	Brooklyn	Borough Park		
PS 132	Conselyea	Williamsburg		
PS 133	William A. Butler	Park Slope		
PS 137	Rachel Jean Mitchell School	Bedford-Stuyvesant		
PS 145	Andrew Jackson	Bushwick	Andrew Jackson	
PS 151	Lyndon B. Johnson	Bushwick	Lyndon B. Johnson	
PS 155	Nicholas Herkimer	Bedford-Stuyvesant	Nicholas Herkimer	
PS 157	Benjamin Franklin	Bedford-Stuyvesant	Benjamin Franklin	
PS 160	William T. Sampson	Sunset Park	William T. Sampson	
PS 169	Sunset Park	Sunset Park		
PS 196	Ten Eyck	Bushwick		
PS 243	Weeksville	Crown Heights		
PS 250	George H. Lindsay	Williamsburg	George H. Lindsay	
PS 256	Benjamin Banneker	Bedford-Stuyvesant	Benjamin Banneker	
PS 257	John F. Hylan	Williamsburg	Mayor John Francis Hylan	
PS 261	Zipporiah Mills	Boerum Hill	Zipporiah Mills, former principal	
PS 262	El Hajj Malik Shabazz	Bedford-Stuyvesant	Malcolm X	
PS 270	Johann Dekalb	Clinton Hill	Johann de Kalb	
PS 274	Kosciusko	Bushwick		
PS 287	Bailey K. Ashford	Downtown Brooklyn	Bailey K. Ashford	
PS 295		Sunset Park		
PS 297	Abraham Stockton	Bedford-Stuyvesant		
PS 299	Thomas Warren Field	Bushwick		
PS 301	Satellite East Middle School	Bedford-Stuyvesant		
PS 304	Casimir Pulaski	Bedford-Stuyvesant	Casimir Pulaski	
PS 305	Dr. Peter Ray	Bedford-Stuyvesant		
PS 307	Daniel Hale Williams	Vinegar Hill	Daniel H. Williams	
PS 309	George E. Wibecan	Bedford-Stuyvesant		
PS 319	Walter Nowinski	Williamsburg		
PS 321	William Penn School	Park Slope		
PS 376		Bushwick		
PS 377	Alejandrina B. Degautier	Bushwick		
PS 380	John Wayne Elementary	Williamsburg	John Wayne	
	Frederick Douglass Academy IV Secondary School	Bedford-Stuyvesant	Frederick Douglass	
PS 384	Frances E. Carter	Bushwick		

=== Region 9: Manhattan, the Bronx ===
School number	School name	Neighborhood	Named for:	References
PS 1	Courtlandt School	Melrose, Bronx		
PS 2	Meyer London	Chinatown, Manhattan		
PS 3	The John Melser Charrette School	Greenwich Village, Manhattan	John Melser, founding principal	
PS 5	Port Morris	Longwood, Bronx		
PS 6	Lillie D. Blake	Upper East Side, Manhattan		
PS 7	Samuel Stern	East Harlem, Manhattan		
PS 11	William T Harris	Chelsea, Manhattan	William T. Harris	
PS 15	Roberto Clemente	East Village, Manhattan	Roberto Clemente	
PS 18	Park Terrace	Inwood, Manhattan	John Peter Zenger	
PS 19	Asher Levy	East Village, Manhattan	Asher Levy	
PS 20	Anna Silver	Lower East Side, Manhattan		
PS/MS 29	Melrose School	Melrose, Bronx		
PS 30	Hernandez/Hughes	East Harlem, Manhattan		
PS 30	Wilton	Mott Haven, Bronx		
PS/MS 31	William Lloyd Garrison	Concourse Village, Bronx	William Lloyd Garrison	
PS 33	Chelsea School	Chelsea, Manhattan		
PS 38	Roberto Clemente	East Harlem, Manhattan	Roberto Clemente	
	River East Elementary	East Harlem, Manhattan		
PS 40	Augustus St. Gaudens	Gramercy Park, Manhattan	Augustus Saint-Gaudens	
PS 41	Greenwich Village	Greenwich Village, Manhattan		
PS 42	Benjamin Altman	Lower East Side, Manhattan	Benjamin Altman	
PS 43	Jonas Bronck	Mott Haven	Jonas Bronck	
PS 49	Willis Ave	South Bronx		
PS 51	Elias Howe	Hell's Kitchen, Manhattan	Elias Howe	
PS 59	Beekman Hill Int’l	Upper East Side, Manhattan		
PS 63	William McKinley	Upper East Side, Manhattan	William McKinley	
PS 65	Mother Hale Academy	Mott Haven, Bronx		
IS 70	O. Henry	Chelsea, Manhattan		
PS 72	Lexington Academy	East Harlem, Manhattan		
PS 77	Lower Lab School	Upper East Side, Manhattan		
PS 83	Luis Muñoz Rivera	East Harlem, Manhattan	Luis Muñoz Rivera	
PS 89	Williamsbridge	Pelham Parkway, Bronx		
PS 102	Jacques Cartier	East Harlem, Manhattan		
PS 108	Assembly Angelo Del Toro	East Harlem, Manhattan		
PS 112	José Celso Barbosa	East Harlem, Manhattan	José Celso Barbosa	
PS 116	Mary Lindley Murray	Murray Hill, Manhattan	Mary Lindley Murray	
PS 124	Yung Wing	Chinatown, Manhattan		
PS/IS 126	Alfred E Smith	Chinatown, Manhattan	Al Smith	
PS 130	Hernando Desoto	Little Italy, Manhattan	Hernando de Soto	
PS 134	Henrietta Szold	Lower East Side, Manhattan	Henrietta Szold	
PS 137	John L Bernstein	Lower East Side, Manhattan		
PS 142	Amalia Castro	Lower East Side, Manhattan		
PS 146	Ann M Short	East Harlem, Manhattan		
PS 150	Tribeca Learning School	Tribeca, Manhattan		
PS 155	William Paca	East Harlem, Manhattan		
PS 157	Grove Hill	Longwood, Bronx		
PS 158	Bayard Taylor	Upper East Side, Manhattan	Bayard Taylor	
PS 161	Ponce de Léon	Longwood, Bronx	Juan Ponce de León	
PS 171	Patrick Henry	Harlem, Manhattan	Patrick Henry	
	The Bilingual Bicultural School	East Harlem, Manhattan		
PS 179		Mott Haven		
PS 182	Luis Muñoz Rivera	Clason Point, Bronx	Luis Muñoz Rivera	
PS 198	Isador and Ida Straus	Upper East Side, Manhattan	Isidor and Ida Straus	
PS 206	José Celso Barbosa	East Harlem, Manhattan	José Celso Barbosa	
PS 212	Midtown West	Hell's Kitchen, Manhattan		
PS 220	Mott Haven Village School	Mott Haven, Bronx		
PS 234	Independence School	Chambers Street/Tribeca, Manhattan		
PS 277		Mott Haven, Bronx		
PS 290	Manhattan New School	Upper East Side, Manhattan		
	The 47 American Sign Language & English Lower School	Kips Bay, Manhattan		
	Children’s Workshop School	East Village, Manhattan		

=== Region 10: Manhattan, the Bronx ===
School number	School name	Neighborhood	Named for:	References
PS 4	Duke Ellington	Washington Heights, Manhattan	Duke Ellington	
PS 5	Ellen Lurie	Inwood, Manhattan		
PS 8	Luis Belliard	Washington Heights, Manhattan		
PS 9	Renaissance School for Music and Art	Upper West Side, Manhattan	Sarah Anderson	
PS 20	P.O. George J. Werdan III	Norwood, Bronx		
PS 28	Wright Brothers	Washington Heights, Manhattan	Wright brothers	
PS 36	Margaret Douglas	Morningside Heights, Manhattan		
PS 46	Arthur Tappan	Harlem, Manhattan	Arthur Tappan	
PS 48	Po Michael J. Buczek	Washington Heights, Manhattan		
PS 76	A. Philip Randolph	Harlem, Manhattan	A. Philip Randolph	
PS 84	Lillian Weber	Upper West Side, Manhattan		
PS 87	William Sherman	Upper West Side, Manhattan	William Sherman	
PS 92	Mary McLeod Bethune	Harlem, Manhattan	Mary McLeod Bethune	
PS 98	Shorackappock	Inwood, Manhattan	Spuyten Duyvil	
PS 115	Alexander Humboldt	Washington Heights, Manhattan	Alexander von Humboldt	
PS 123	Mahalia Jackson	Harlem, Manhattan	Mahalia Jackson	
PS 125	Ralph Bunche	Morningside Heights, Manhattan	Ralph Bunche	
PS 128	Audubon	Washington Heights, Manhattan		
PS 129	John H Finley	Harlem, Manhattan		
PS 132	Juan Pablo Duarte	Washington Heights, Manhattan	Juan Pablo Duarte	
PS 133	Fred R Moore	East Harlem, Manhattan		
PS 145	Bloomingdale School	Upper West Side, Manhattan		
PS 152	Dyckman Valley	Inwood, Manhattan		
PS 154	Harriet Tubman	Harlem, Manhattan	Harriet Tubman	
PS 163	Alfred E Smith	Upper West Side, Manhattan	Al Smith	
PS 166	The Richard Rodgers School of the Arts and Technology	Upper West Side, Manhattan	Richard Rodgers	
PS 173	Fresh Meadows	Washington Heights, Manhattan		
PS 175	Henry H Garnet	Harlem, Manhattan	Henry Highland Garnet	
	Prof. Juan Bosch Public School	Inwood, Manhattan		
PS 185	John M. Langston	Washington Heights, Manhattan	John Mercer Langston	
PS 187	Hudson Cliffs	Washington Heights, Manhattan		
PS 189		Washington Heights, Manhattan		
PS 191	Amsterdam	Upper West Side, Manhattan		
PS 192	Jacob H Schiff	Harlem, Manhattan	Jacob Schiff	
PS 197	John B Russwurm	Harlem, Manhattan	John Brown Russwurm	
PS 200	James M Smith	Harlem, Manhattan	James McCune Smith	
PS 208	Alain L Locke	Harlem, Manhattan	Alain LeRoy Locke	
PS242M	G. P. Brown Comp. School	Harlem, Manhattan		
PS 325		Harlem, Manhattan		
PS 333	Manhattan School for Children	Upper West Side, Manhattan		
PS 859	Special Music School	Upper West Side, Manhattan		

=== Empowerment Schools: citywide ===
School number	School name	Neighborhood	Named for:	References
	Hellenic Classical Charter School	Sunset Park, Brooklyn		
	Community Roots Charter School	Downtown Brooklyn/Fort Greene, Brooklyn		
PS 314	Muscota New School	Inwood, Manhattan		
PS 315	The East Village Community School	East Village, Manhattan		
PS 363	Neighborhood School	East Village, Manhattan		
PS 364	Earth School	East Village, Manhattan		
	Central Park East I	East Harlem, Manhattan		
	Amber Charter School	East Harlem, Manhattan		
	Central Park East II	East Harlem, Manhattan		
	The Bellaire School	Queens Village, Queens		
PS 252	The Queens School of Inquiry	Flushing, Queens		
PS 499	The Queens College School for Math, Science, and Technology	Flushing, Queens		
	51 Avenue Academy	Elmhurst, Queens		
	Bronx Charter School for Arts	Hunts Point, Bronx		
	Magnet School of Math, Science and Design Technology	South Slope, Brooklyn		
PS 6		Flatbush, Brooklyn		
PS 9	Sarah Anderson	Upper West Side, Manhattan		
PS 14	Sen. John Calandra	Schuylerville, Bronx		
PS 16	Wakefield	Wakefield, Bronx		
PS 21	Crispus Attucks	Bedford-Stuyvesant, Brooklyn	Crispus Attucks	
PS 23	The New Children’s School	Belmont, Bronx		
PS 24		Sunset Park, Brooklyn		
PS 29	John M. Harrigan	Cobble Hill, Brooklyn		
PS 32	The Gifford School	Great Kills, Staten Island		
PS 35	Franz Siegel	Concourse Village, Bronx		
PS 42	Claremont	Claremont Village, Bronx		
PS 49	Dorothy Bonawit Kole	Middle Village, Queens		
PS 50	Vito Marcantonio	East Harlem, Manhattan		
PS 52	Queens	Springfield Gardens, Queens		
PS 56	Harry Eichler	Richmond Hill, Queens		
PS 59	The Comm School Of Technology	Belmont, Bronx		
PS 64	Robert Simon	East Village, Manhattan		
PS 69	The New Vision School	Jackson Heights, Queens		
PS 71	Rose E. Scala	Ridgewood, Queens		
PS 75	Emily Dickinson	Upper West Side, Manhattan	Emily Dickinson	
PS 81	Thaddeus Stevens	Bedford-Stuyvesant, Brooklyn	Thaddeus Stevens	
PS 86	Kingsbridge Heights	Jerome Park, Bronx		
PS 88	S. Silverstein Little School	Claremont Village, Bronx		
PS 103	Hector Fontanez	Wakefield, Bronx	New York Police Office Hector Fontanez (killed in the line of duty on September 12, 1991)	
PS 105	The Blythebourne	Borough Park, Brooklyn		
PS 114	Luis Llorens Torres Chl	Concourse, Bronx	Luis Llorens Torres	
PS 115	Daniel Mucatel School	Canarsie, Brooklyn	Principal Daniel Mucatel, who died unexpectedly in 1999	
PS 121	Throop	Allerton, Bronx		
PS 130	Hernando Desoto	Little Italy, Manhattan	Hernando de Soto	
PS 139	Alexine A. Fenty	Flatbush, Brooklyn		
PS 146	Ann M. Short	East Harlem, Manhattan		
PS 147	Isaac Remsen	Williamsburg, Brooklyn		
PS 149	Danny Kaye		Danny Kaye	
PS 149	Sojourner Truth	Harlem, Manhattan	Sojourner Truth	
PS 151	Mary D. Carter	Astoria, Queens		
PS 153	Adam Clayton Powell	Harlem, Manhattan	Adam Clayton Powell	
PS 154	Jonathan D. Hyatt	Mott Haven, Bronx		
PS 161	Don Pedro Albizu Campos	Harlem, Manhattan	Pedro Albizu Campos	
PS 165	Robert E. Simon	Upper West Side, Manhattan	Robert E. Simon	
PS 172	Beacon School Of Excellence	Greenwood Heights, Brooklyn		
PS 180	Hugo Newman	Harlem, Manhattan		
PS 183	Robert L. Stevenson	Upper East Side, Manhattan	Robert Louis Stevenson	
PS 193	Gil Hodges	Midwood, Brooklyn	Gil Hodges	
PS 194	Countee Cullen	Harlem, Manhattan		
PS 199	Jessie Isador Straus	West 70th Street, Manhattan	Jesse I. Straus	
PS 209	Margaret Mead	Sheepshead Bay, Brooklyn	Margaret Mead	
PS 210	21st Century Academy	Harlem, Manhattan		
PS 215	Morris H. Weiss	Gravesend, Brooklyn		
PS 226	University Heights, Bronx			
PS 228	ECC	East Elmhurst, Queens		
PS 230	Doris L. Cohen	Kensington, Brooklyn		
PS 230	Dr. Roland N. Patterson	Gravesend, Brooklyn		
PS 273	Wortman	Richmond Hill, Queens		
PS 279	Herman Schreiber	Canarsie, Brooklyn		
PS 282	Park Slope	Park Slope, Brooklyn		
PS 291		University Heights, Bronx		
PS 315	Dist 22	Flatbush, Brooklyn		
PS 321	William Penn	Park Slope, Brooklyn	William Penn	
PS 334	The Anderson School	Citywide		
PS 340		Kingsbridge, Bronx		
PS 360		Kingsbridge, Bronx		
PS 372	The Children’s School	Gowanus, Brooklyn		
PS 399	Stanley Eugene Clark	East Flatbush, Brooklyn		

=== Special Education District 75: citywide ===
School number	School name	Neighborhood	Named for:	References
PS 4 (Staten Island)				
PS 9				
PS 17 X	Denzel Washington		Denzel Washington	
PS 53 K				
PS 94 M				
PS 140 K				
PS 224 Q				
PS 231K				
PS 372	The Children’s School			
PS 373 R				
PS 352 X	The Vida Bogart School for All Children			
PS 371	Lillian L. Rashkis			

=== Charter schools: citywide ===
School number	School name	Neighborhood	Named for:	References
	Public Prep	Manhattan (Lower East Side), The Bronx (South Bronx)		
	Democracy Prep Public Schools	Manhattan (Harlem)		
	Success Academy Charter Schools	Manhattan; Bronx; Brooklyn		
	Harlem Village Academies	Manhattan		
	Knowledge is Power Program	Manhattan		
	Future Leaders Institute Charter School	Harlem, Manhattan		
	Strive Charter School	Mott Haven, Bronx		

== Glossary ==
In some of the literature issued by the New York City Board of Education there may be a letter or a string of two letters, which may be before or after the school number.

Boroughs: The City of New York comprises five geographic sections called "boroughs." Schools that are part of community school districts, high schools, and specialized superintendencies all receive a borough designation as follows:

K = Brooklyn (Kings County)
M = Manhattan
Q = Queens
R = Staten Island (Richmond County)
X = Bronx

School levels:

E = Elementary
I = J.H.S, middle & intermediate
H = High school

Instructional leadership division:

Division 1 - Bronx (BX)
Division 2 - Bronx (BX)
Division 3 - Queens (QNS)
Division 4 - Queens (QNS)
Division 5 - Queens (QNS) & Brooklyn (BK)
Division 6 - Brooklyn (BK)
Division 7 - Brooklyn (BK) & Staten Island (SI)
Division 8 - Brooklyn (BK)
Division 9 - Manhattan (M) & Bronx (BX)
Division 10 - Manhattan (M)

== See also ==
- Education in New York City
- New Explorations into Science, Technology and Math
- Empowerment School
