= Pace High School =

Pace High School may refer to:

- Pace University High School, New York, New York
- Pace High School (Florida), Pace, Florida
- Pace High School (Texas), Brownsville, Texas
- Pace Alternative High School, Tucson, Arizona
- Pace Preparatory Academy (Camp Verde, Arizona), Camp Verde, Arizona
- Pace Preparatory Academy (Humboldt, Arizona), Dewey-Humboldt, Arizona
- Pace Preparatory Academy (Prescott Valley, Arizona), Prescott Valley, Arizona
- Pace School, West Springfield, Massachusetts
- Monsignor Edward Pace High School, Opa Locka, Florida
