= Ross School =

Ross School can refer to:

- Ross School of Business at the University of Michigan, in Ann Arbor, Michigan, United States
- Ross School (East Hampton, New York), a private K-12 school in East Hampton, New York, United States
- Ross Global Academy, a defunct charter school in New York City, New York, United States
