= East Side Community High School =

Public school in New York City

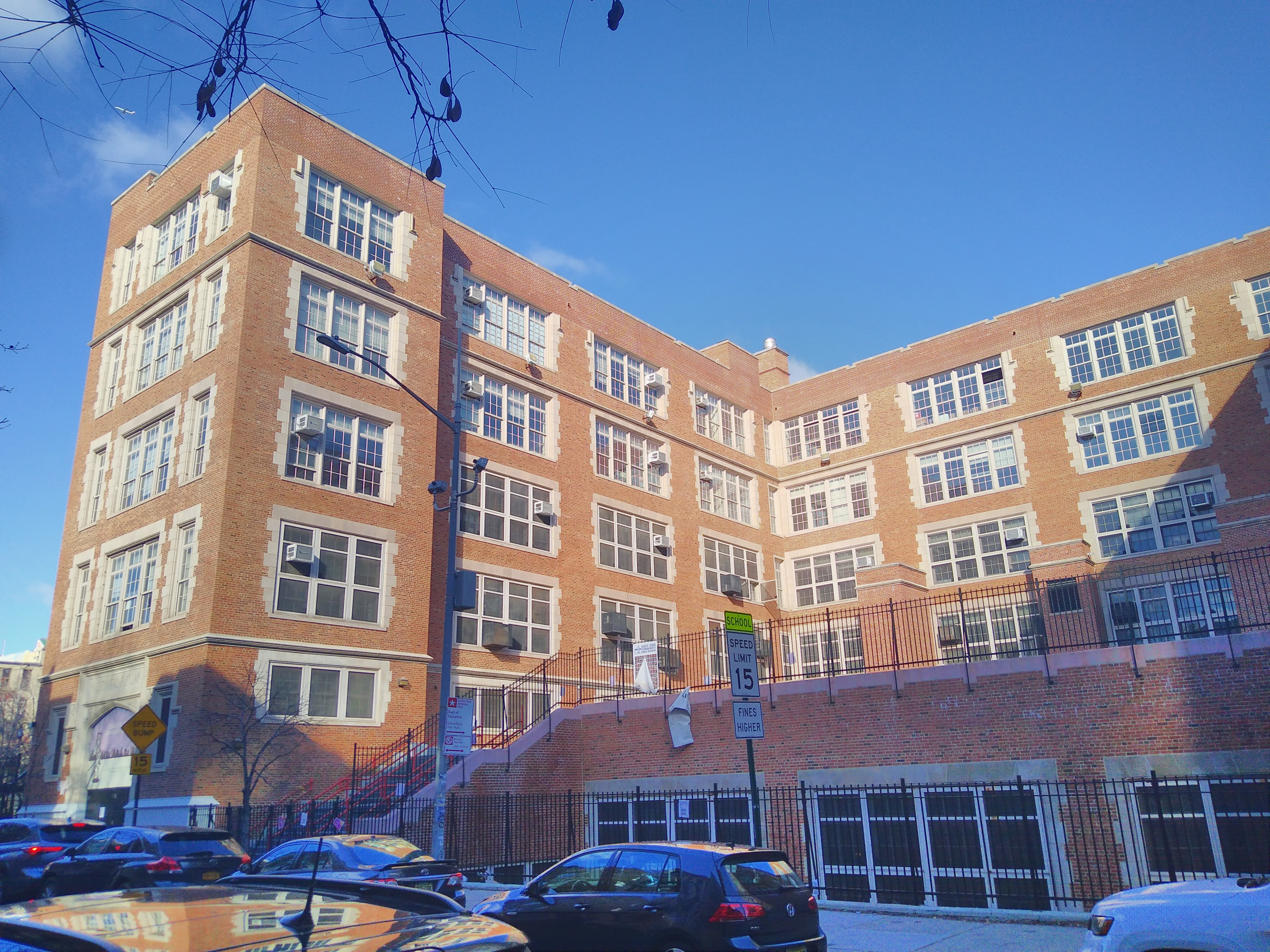

Location
- 420 East 12th Street; New York, New York; United States; 40.729167°N 73.982222°W

Information
- Type: Public
- Established: 1991
- School district: New York City Geographic District # 1
- NCES School ID: 360007600695
- Principal: Mark Federman
- Faculty: 42.60 (on FTE basis)
- Grades: 6–12
- Enrollment: 560 (2009–10)
- Student to teacher ratio: 13.15:1
- Colors: Blue and White
- Mascot: Tigers
- Nickname: East Side
- Website: eschs.org

East Side Community High School or East Side Community School is a public school at 420 East 12th Street in the East Village neighborhood of Manhattan in New York City. Founded in 1991, it is for students from the 6th to 12th grade. Its principal is Mark Federman. Girls Prep, a charter school, was housed inside the same building. The building also housed Ross Global Academy, another charter school, until 2011.

== Demographics ==
As of 2010, the racial makeup of East Side Community School consists of 54% Hispanic, 17% Black, 15% White, 10% Asian or Pacific Islander and 4% other.
