= Benjamin Banneker Academy =

Public school in New York City

Benjamin Banneker Academy For Community Development

Location
- 77 Clinton Avenue; Brooklyn, New York City 11205, New York 11205; United States; 40°41′43.8″N 73°58′8.4″W

Information
- Type: Public, Empowerment School
- Established: 1987
- School district: 13
- NCES District ID: 3600091
- School number: K670
- NCES School ID: 360009102315
- Faculty: (on an FTE basis)
- Grades: 9–12, SE
- Enrollment: 837 (as of 2021-2022)
  - Grade 9: 188
  - Grade 10: 223
  - Grade 11: 232
  - Grade 12: 194
- Student to teacher ratio: 14.26
- Colors: Black and gold
- Mascot: Warriors
- Website: Benjamin Banneker Academy

Benjamin Banneker Academy for Community Development (usually called Banneker) is a public high school located in the Clinton Hill section of Brooklyn, New York City. The school was originally a Drake's Cakes factory. Still today, different floors of the school are in Drake's colors, blue and yellow. It has a small, but family type atmosphere for a high school. It is usually called a junior college because the faculty and students are so focused on college. Banneker, which serves grades 9 through 12+, is operated by the New York City Department of Education. Many of the graduates attend SUNY schools, HBCUs (historically black colleges and universities) and CUNY schools. There are also a few that attend Ivy League schools and a few are recruited for Posse schools. The school's graduation rate has been at least 90% since 2002.

== School information ==
The school's colors are black and gold. Each year Banneker holds a homecoming party for the students in which they wear the school colors. This event is usually the final event to their School Spirit Week, which places a different theme on each day of that week. Some of the themes include Twin Day, "Celebrity Look A Like Day", and Flag Day. School Spirit week and Homecoming events are planned by the senior committee and is held the Friday before the Thanksgiving recess.

The school was founded in 1987. Its name commemorates Benjamin Banneker, an African American scientist, surveyor, almanac author and farmer.

== Student demographics ==
As of the 2014–15 school year, the school had an enrollment of 920 students and 43.0 classroom teachers (on an FTE basis), for a student–teacher ratio of 21.4:1. There were 414 students (45.0% of enrollment) eligible for free lunch and 49 (5.3% of students) eligible for reduced-cost lunch.

There are 831 students in the school. The demographics are 83.39% African American, 12.03% Hispanic or Latino, 2.76% Asian, 1.5% White (non-Hispanic) and 0.32% Native American.

== Extracurricular activities ==
Benjamin Banneker Academy is known for its many extracurricular activities, which include a variety of sport teams, clubs and community service organizations.

Some special events that happen at Banneker annually are the fashion shows that are presented by the school's fashion clubs, "ETC Fashion Group" and the "Senior Fashion Show" and Homecoming.

=== Sports teams ===
- Baseball Boys Varsity
- Basketball Boys Varsity
- Basketball Boys Jr. Varsity
- Basketball Girls Varsity
- Basketball Girls Jr. Varsity
- Bowling Boys Varsity
- Cheerleading
- Cross Country Girls Varsity
- Cross Country Boys Varsity
- Fencing Boys Varsity
- Fencing Girls Varsity
- Indoor Track Girls Varsity
- Indoor Track Boys Varsity
- Outdoor Track Girls Varsity
- Outdoor Track Boys Varsity
- Soccer Girls Varsity
- Soccer Boys Varsity
- Softball Girls Varsity
- Tennis Boys Varsity
- Tennis Girls Varsity
- Volleyball Girls Varsity
- Volleyball Boys Varsity
- Rowing

== See also ==
- Empowerment school
