= The Anderson School PS 334 =

Coordinates: 40.78082°N 73.97710°W

PS 334 The Anderson School

Location
- 100 West 77th Street; New York NY 10024

Information
- Established: PS 9: 1830; The Anderson Program: 1987; Anderson Middle School: 2003; PS 334, Indep. School: 2005
- Leadership: Claudia Harris, principal IA
- Colors: Red & White
- Mascot: Dragon
- Publication: Yearbook: The Anderson Journal
- Affiliations: District 3: Citywide; System: NYC DOE; Accreditation: USNY
- Website: www.ps334anderson.org

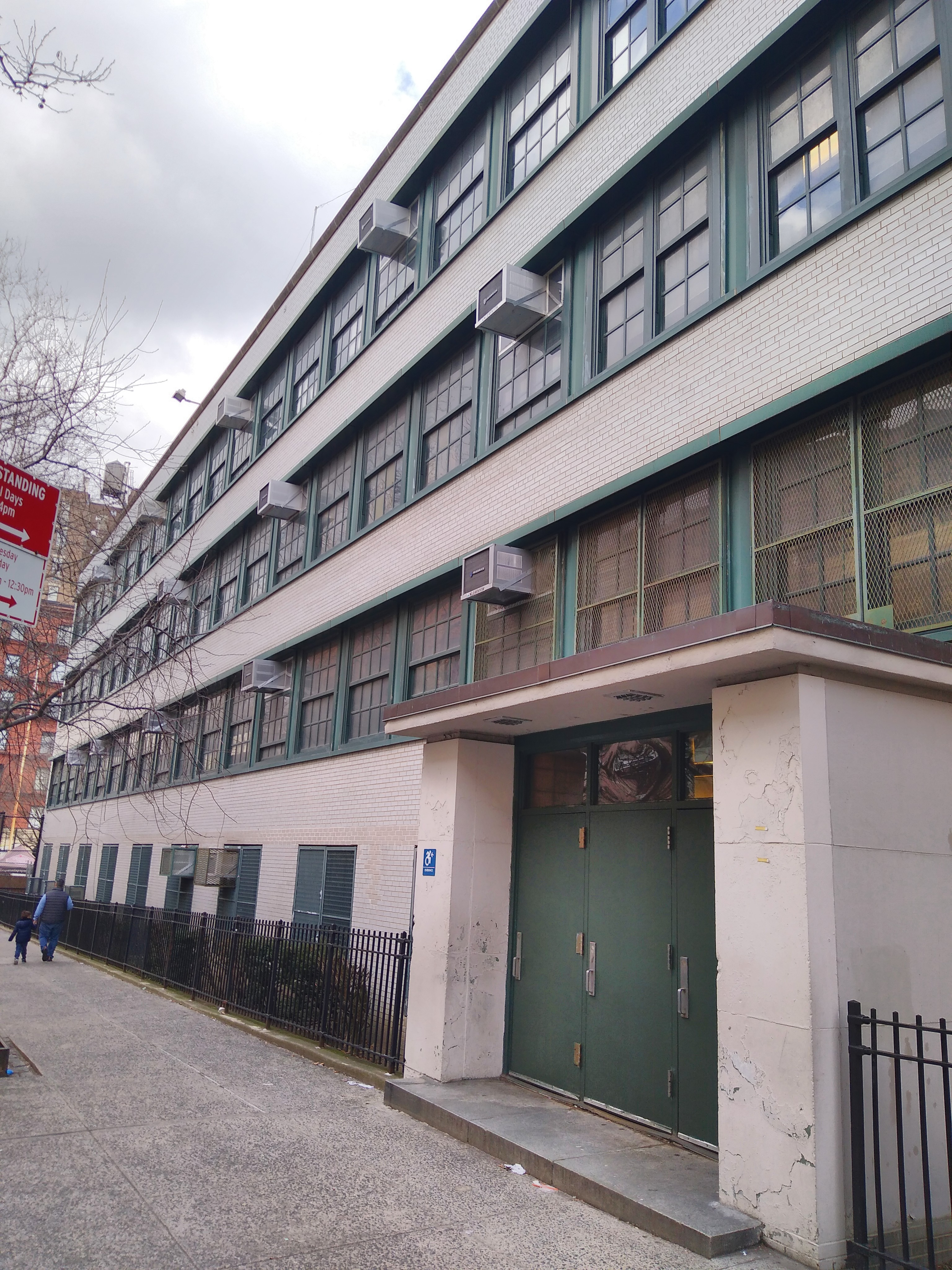
77th Street

The Anderson School PS 334 is a New York City school for children in grades kindergarten through 8 from the city's five boroughs. It was founded thirty-nine years ago (September 1987) as The Anderson Program under the stewardship of PS 9. The New York City Department of Education (DOE) spun off Anderson in July 2005 as a stand-alone school — PS 334.

== Enrollment ==
Anderson's enrollment for the 2018–19 school year was 535 students. Since inception, Anderson has had two sections (classrooms) per grade.

== School names ==
The Anderson School (PS 334) inherited its name from its former parent school, the Sarah Anderson School, a K-5 neighborhood catchment school that offers two programs: Renaissance and Gifted and Talented. Until PS 334 moved to 100 West 77th Street in July 2009, both schools shared a building at 100 West 84th Street.

Sarah Anderson (1922–1981) was a beloved school paraprofessional. The school community petitioned the Board of Education to rename PS 9 in her honor. It became official during her memorial dedication in May 1981.

In 1993, under Principal Joan Gutkin, PhD (1936–1997), PS 9 (then the host school for The Anderson Program) received magnet school funding for music and art and henceforth adopted the name, "Renaissance School of Music and Art." Ever since, PS 9 has used both names.

== Physical plant ==
- Sept 1987 – July 2009, Anderson shared a building with its founding parent school P.S. 9, The Sarah Anderson School, at 100 W 84th Street.
- July 2009 – Present, Anderson moved to a slightly older building six blocks due south at 100 W 77th Street, initially, sharing it with (i) The Computer School, (ii) JHS 44 O'Shea Middle School (a district middle school), and (iii) West Prep Academy (a district middle school). At the start of the 2010–11 school year, PS 452, a new neighborhood elementary school (3 sections per grade), moved in the building. July 2011 JHS 44 O'Shea Middle School was phased out and West Prep Academy moved to the P.S. 145 building at 150 West 105 Street. In July 2017, PS 452 moved to 210 West 61st street and the Dual Language Middle School moved in to the vacated space on the second floor of the O'Shea Complex.

== Awards and achievements ==
- In the 2023 Middle School National Championship Tournament held in Chicago, Illinois, (also known as the NAQT MSNCT) the Anderson A team tied for 5th place.

== See also ==
- List of public elementary schools in New York City
- List of middle schools in New York City
