= Vincent Cavallaro =

American painter

Vincent Cavallaro (November 8, 1912 - May 22, 1985) was a painter, sculptor and abstract artist. He was born in Cambridge, Massachusetts and died in New York City. He was a United States citizen, raised and educated in Italy (Milan).

He has been honored in the States with an award from the MoMA (War Poster, 1941), commissions from the National Gallery of Art ("Man in Space" program, 1968), and commissions to create many public and private murals and monuments individuals and institutions, including public schools in the New York City area (circa 1963 - 1975).

== Public installations and permanent collections ==
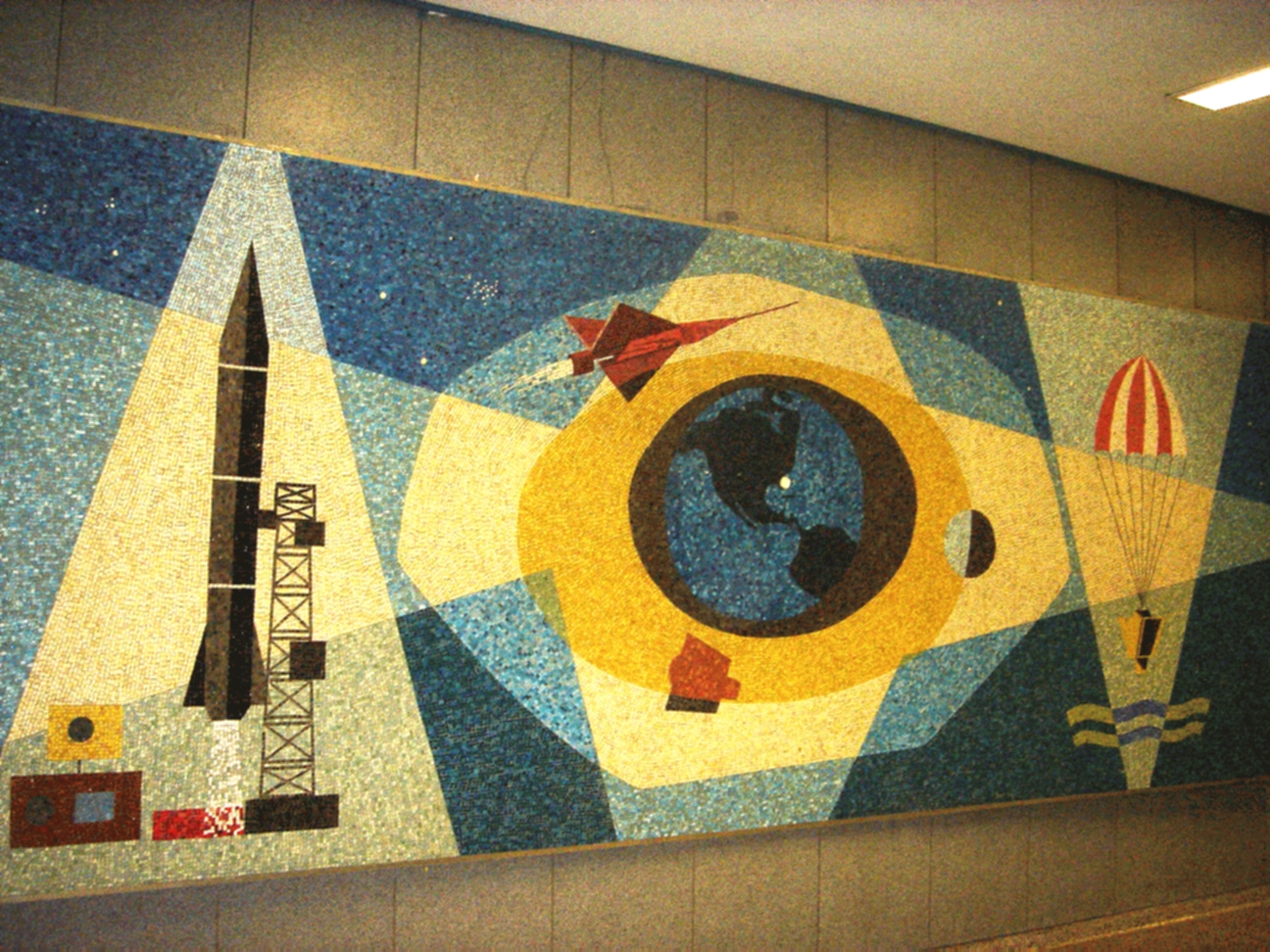
2007 photo: Man in Space, Glass Mosaic at PS 9, Manhattan, Vincent Cavallaro, 1965

- 1962 — Mosaic, Brigadier General Casimir Pulaski, on Horseback, With His Aides, Casimir Pulaski Elementary School, PS 304, Brooklyn.
- 1963 — Bas-relief for a Main Hallway of the Horizon Building, New Jersey.
- 1965 — Glass Mosaic, Man in Space (8 x 21 feet), Public School 9, Upper West Side, Manhattan.
- 1966 — Bronze sculpture (location unknown, but thought to be a high school in Queens)
- 1967 — Sculpture, Man in Space, Bronze (4 feet x 10 feet x 8 inches). Relief composed of geometrically-shaped figures enclosed in geometric spaces conveys the theme of man in space and the education of science — located at Peter Rouget Junior High School 88, 544 Seventh Avenue, courtyard entrance, east wall, Brooklyn. The sculpture cost $10,000. Final approval was given July 10, 1967. Condition: Surveyed 1992 October. Treatment needed.
- 1968 — In cooperation with the National Gallery of Art, NASA commissioned Cavallaro to give his artistic perspective of Saturn V Apollo launch. Cavallaro painted nine works, all now in the possession of the National Air and Space Museum, Garber Facility. He was one of dozens of nationally known artist who had participated in the NASA Art Program, which chronicled the wonders, risks and triumphs of space exploration through the eyes of artists.
1. Ignition Sequence (1968), painting, oil and acrylic on canvas; current owner: National Air and Space Museum (A19750915000)
2. Power To Go, painting, mixed media on canvas; current owner: National Air and Space Museum (A19760292000)
3. After Image , acrylic on canvas; current owner: National Air and Space Museum (A19781061000)
4. Untitled I (1967–68), painting, mixed media on canvas; current owner: National Air and Space Museum (A19810581000)
5. Untitled II (1967–68), painting, mixed media on canvas; current owner: National Air and Space Museum (A19810582000)
6. Untitled III (1967–68), painting, mixed media on canvas; current owner: National Air and Space Museum (A19810583000)
7. Untitled IV (1967–68), painting, mixed media on canvas; current owner: National Air and Space Museum (A19810584000)
8. Untitled V (1967–68), painting, mixed media on canvas; current owner: National Air and Space Museum (A19810585000)
9. Untitled VI, painting, mixed media on canvas; current owner: National Air and Space Museum (A19810586000)
- 1969 — Outdoor Sculpture, Gemini, 1967–1969, bronze; base: concrete, painted (approximately 13 feet 2 inches x 4 feet 8 inches x 3 feet 6 inches; base: height 37 inches x diameter 11 feet). Inscription (on circle, side facing auditorium): Cavallaro (signed). Subject: Emblem — Zodiac. Located at John Dewey HS, Brooklyn, Brooklyn. The sculpture cost $30,000. Final approval was given October 14, 1969.
- 1969 — Sculpture, Social Communication A five-panel abstract relief: hydrostone with epoxy paint (8 inches x 4 feet x 9 inches). The sculpture cost $15,000. Final approval was given on Sept. 30, 1971. (location unknown, but thought to be a high school in Queens)
- 1975 — Aluminum Sheets Painted With Enamel, Untitled PS 142, Amelia Castro School, Manhattan.

== Bygone Installations ==
- 1960 — Commissioned art for The Gaucho Room (a.k.a. El Gaucho Restaurant), The Summit Hotel (51st & Lexington)

Designed by Morris Lapidus, Loews Corporation built and opened the hotel in 1961. Lapidus gave the Gaucho room an Argentine flavor, where walls looked like cowhide, lamp fixtures were shaped like steer skulls and the ceiling was ornamented with cattle brands. The Gaucho was modeled on a restaurant of the same name at the Americana Hotel in Bal Harbour, Florida (now the Sheraton Bal Harbour). Loews remodeled it in 2002, renaming it "Metropolitan." Loews sold it to Hilton Hotels Corporation in 2003, and is renamed it the "Doubletree Metropolitan." On March 29, 2005, the New York City Landmarks Commission designated the Summit Hotel as a Landmark.

- 1966 — 30 lithographs for the Hilton Hotel, New York.

== Selected Shows ==
- 1941 — Merit Award (Group B), United States Department of the Treasury Defense Poster Competition, MoMA
- 1950 — Solo Exposition, Schwarts Gallery, Chicago
- 1957 — Solo Exposition, Highgate Gallery, Montclair, New Jersey
- 1958 — Group Exposition, Henri Gallery, Alexandria, Virginia
- 1959 — Semi-Solo Exposition, The Architectural League of New York
- 1959 — Semi-Solo Exposition, Highgate Gallery, New York
- 1960 — Participant, Salon International, Monte Carlo
- 1960 — Group Exposition, Galerie Norval, New York
- 1960 — Group Exposition, Carnegie Hall, New York
- 1960 — Semi-Solo Exposition, Highgate Gallery, 827 Third Avenue, New York (Oct thru Nov 8)
- 1961 — Semi-Solo Exposition, Fairleigh Dickinson University, NJ
- 1962 — Group Exposition, The Marble Arch Gallery, Miami, Florida
- 1962 — Semi-Solo Exposition, International Graphics, J.L. Hudson Gallery, Detroit, Michigan
- 1963 — Semi-Solo Exposition, Fairleigh Dickinson University, NJ
- 1965 — Group Exposition, Museum of Fine Arts, Eilat, Israel
- 1965 — Film Featuring Aluminum works by Cavallaro, produced by Alcoa
- 1965 — Semi-Solo Exposition: Aluminum in Art, Alcoa, Pittsburgh, Pennsylvania
- 1966 — Group Exposition, Finch College Museum of Art, 62 East 78th Street, New York
- 1966 — Group Exposition, Allentown Art Museum, PA
- 1966 — Semi-Solo Exposition, International Art, Hilton, New York
- 1967 — Group Exposition, Weintraub Gallery, 1193, Lexington Avenue, New York
- 1968 — Commission, NASA Art Program, Washington, D.C.
- 1968 — Commission, National Gallery of Art in partnership with the NASA Art Program, Washington, D.C.
- 1969 — Solo Exposition, Galleria Toninelli, Milan
- 1969 — Semi-Solo Exposition, Catherine Viviano Gallery, (October 7 to Nov. 1), New York
- 1980 — Semi-Solo Exposition, Nardin Galleries, 25 E 73rd St., New York (May 27 - June 29)
- 1980 — Semi-Solo Exposition, Apokalypsis, Nardin Galleries, 25 E 73rd St., New York (Oct 29 - Jan 4)

== Publications ==
- 1979 — Cover: The Trojan Horse, The New York Quarterly (NYQR), Issue 24.
- 1985 — After Image, (1978) (name not credited in publication), Chapter 7 of NASA research publication: Mary M. Connors, PhD, et al., Living Aloft, NASA.

== Family History ==
Mr. Cavallaro was married to Fulvia Burbi (b Oct 22, 1916, Milan, Italy - d. April 17, 1967). His parents were Giovanni Cavallaro and Maria Giuseppa DeBenedetti. He completed a year of formal studies in art in 1933 at Brera Academy in Milan. Under the Italian spelling of his first name, "Vincenzo," he enlisted as a private in the U.S. Army Warrant Officers Program on April 15, 1942, at Fort Jay, Governors Island and served until 1946 (US Army Serial No. 32315213). His enlistment papers reflect that, among other things, he had one year of college and was working as a canvas cover repairman, animation artist, motion picture animation artist, model maker for motion pictures, and general artist. His enlistment papers also indicate that he was 5'7", 120 lbs. and married.
