= Pace University High School =

Public school in New York City

Pace High School

Location
- 100 Hester Street; New York, New York 10002; United States; 40°42′59″N 73°59′37″W

Information
- Type: Public high school, Empowerment School
- Established: 2004
- School district: NYC School Region 9, District 2
- Principal: Eric Glatz
- Faculty: 32 full-time, plus Pace University School of Education faculty
- Grades: 9, 10, 11, 12
- Enrollment: 650
- Colors: Blue and Gold
- Affiliation: Pace University
- Athletics: 8 PSAL teams + Intramural Sports
- Website: www.pacehsnyc.org/site/ www.schools.nyc.gov/schools/M298/

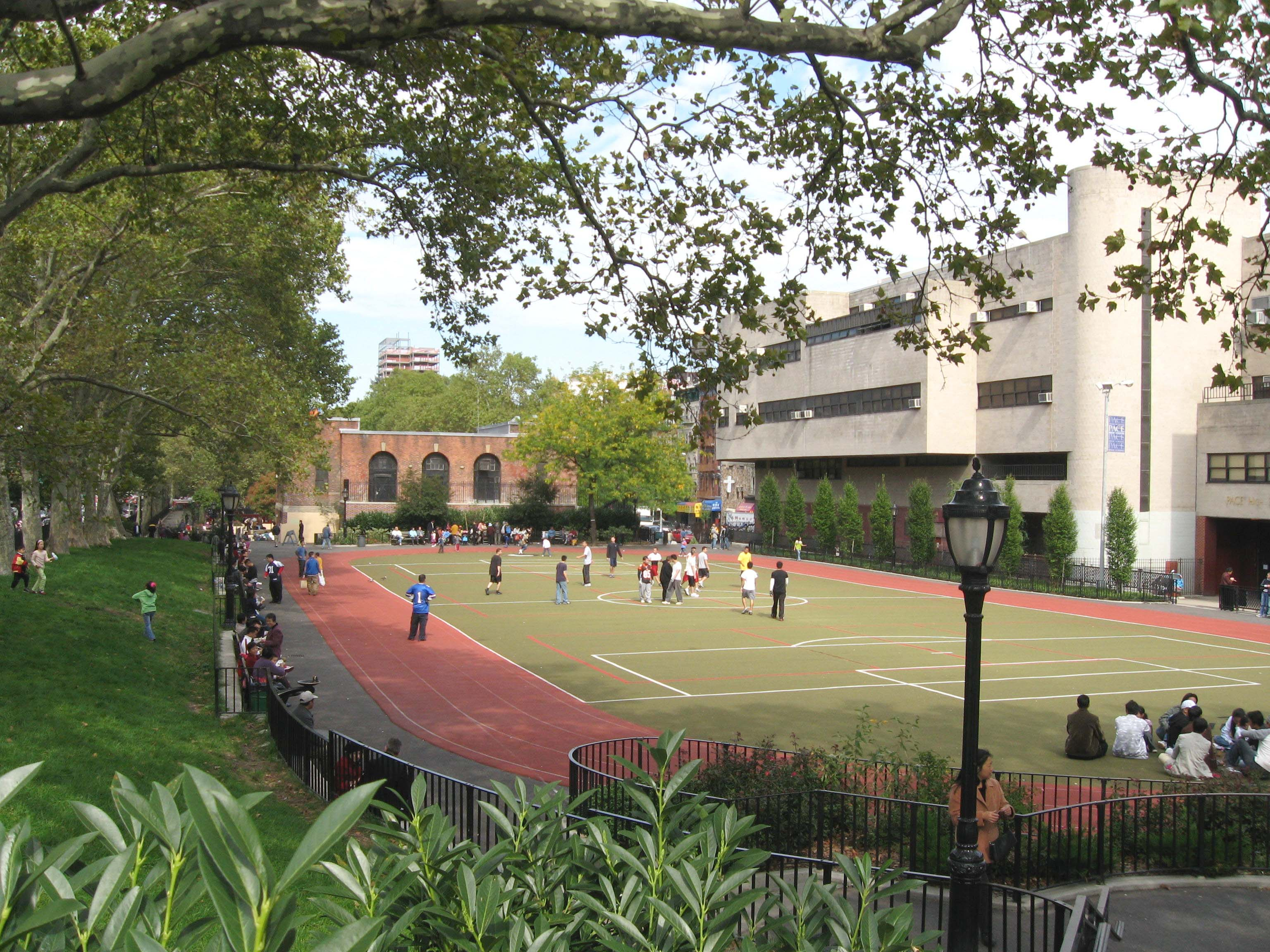
A view of Pace High School from Sara Delano Roosevelt Park

Pace University High School, also known as "Pace High School," is a public high school located in the New York City borough of Manhattan, affiliated with Pace University. The school was established in 2004.

Pace High School is a co-location school. It shares a building with M131 Dr Sun Yat Sen Middle School (M.S. 131) and Emma Lazarus High School.

== History ==
Pace High School was established in 2004 by the New York City Department of Education in collaboration with Pace University. The school was created as one of 332 New York City public schools designed as part of the now defunct program "Empowerment School" which allows it more autonomy in choosing a curriculum.

== College courses ==
11th Grade students are able to take undergraduate college courses through Pace University. Students can graduate high school with a maximum of 15-20 college credits. Tuition is free.

Pace University also offers five scholarships to graduating students every year.
