= NEST+m =

Public school in New York City

New Explorations into Science, Technology and Math High School

Location
- 111 Columbia Street; New York City, New York 10002; United States; 40°43′11″N 73°58′45″W

Information
- School type: Public school
- Mottoes: Love and respect for knowledge
- Established: 2001
- School board: NYCDOE
- School district: 1
- Authority: NYCDOE
- School number: 01M539
- Principal: Celenia Meaghan Lynch (2020-)
- Grades: K-12
- Enrollment: 1617 (2024)
- Average class size: 25-34, depending on grade level and programming
- Language: English
- Hours in school day: 8:15 - 2:35
- Classrooms: 70
- Campus type: Urban
- Colors: Purple and Silver
- Slogan: Don't Forget to SOAR, caw-caw!
- Athletics: Fencing (girls/boys PSAL), Volleyball, Soccer, Basketball, Softball, Baseball, Track and Field, Cross Country, Math Teams A & B, Flag Football
- Sports: Fencing, Soccer, Basketball, Softball, Baseball, Track and Field, Cross Country, Chess, Volleyball
- Mascot: Eagle
- Newspaper: The Eagle
- Yearbook: The Journey
- Communities served: NYC
- Website: www.nestmk12.net

New Explorations into Science, Technology and Math, abbreviated NEST+m, is a selective public school located in Manhattan, New York, and is under the supervision of the New York City Department of Education, serving grades kindergarten through 12th grade.

NEST+m was established in 2001, with its first principal being Celena Chévere. Chévere later resigned in 2006 after pressure from the NYCDOE. As of 2026, the current principal is Meaghan Lynch.

NEST+m has an enrollment of about 1600 students, divided between a lower, middle and upper school. NEST+m is a gifted and talented school, with screened admission. Any student in New York City can apply to the school. Criterion for admission differs between lower, middle and upper school.

NEST+m is located on 111 Columbia Street on the Lower East Side of Manhattan directly next to Houston Street. Actor Hudson Yang is a notable alum of the school.

== History ==
=== Creation and early history ===
NEST+m was established by the New York City Department of Education in 2001 to provide an accelerated educational program for academically advanced students. Originally opening with elementary and middle school grades, the school was designed to offer a rigorous interdisciplinary curriculum with an emphasis on science, technology, mathematics, and the humanities.

NEST+m was established in the former Junior High School 22 building after the previous school closed due to declining enrollment. Prior to the school's opening, parents raised approximately $600,000 dollars to help refurbish the facility for its new use. Celena Chévere served as NEST+m's founding principal. During her tenure, the school's admissions practices became the subject of public controversy. Chévere was accused of making admissions decisions partially influenced by the socio-economic status of the parents of prospective students. Other parents praised her commitment to the school and care for students.

=== Ross Global Academy dispute ===
In 2006, the NYCDOE attempted to compel NEST+m to share its building with a new charter school being created, Ross Global Academy. Schools chancellor Joel Klein cited an excess of space in the building where NEST+m was housed. In a letter sent to parents by the NYCDOE, it was stated only half of the building's capacity was being used. Opposition was raised by NEST+m parents due to concerns over dividing space and resources with another school, while also saying the NYCDOE was underestimating the amount of space. When the NYCDOE conducted an audit of the school to assess how much space there was, Chévere was accused of moving classes around to give the impression of a crowded building. The NEST+m PTA also filed a lawsuit to prevent Ross Global Academy from moving in. The resulting court hearings were filled with parents from both sides. The NEST+m community also organized a demonstration outside a ball keynoted by Joel Klein.

The dispute concluded when Assembly Speaker Sheldon Silver intervened in support of NEST+m. Silver held the control over a bill to lift the charter school cap that Klein was in favor of. As a result, the NYCDOE backed down and Ross Global Academy was given another location. By this time, Chévere had already filed for resignation, allowing her to avoid penalties from a misconduct charge by the NYCDOE. Chévere was replaced by Stuyvesant assistant principal Olga Livanis.

=== Livanis' tenure (2006-2015) ===
In the immediate aftermath of Chévere's departure, there was tension between parents and the new principal Livanis. Parents raised complaints about the elimination of single-sex math, science and sports classes and not hiring a nurse and crossing guard. Livanis responded by saying the termination of single-sex classes was for fiscal reasons and she had in fact hired a nurse and crossing guard. In an October 26, 2006, PTA meeting, the executive members of the PTA resigned, citing unresponsiveness from the new NEST+m administration. Livanis, not present at the meeting, called the police after reports of physical fighting. The police dispersed the 300-some parents gathered.

In summer 2012, a petition was signed by 500 parents and faculty at NEST+m criticizing Livanis for giving low performance ratings to well-liked teachers and refusing to share budgetary information. In September of that year, teachers asked to be paid overtime for Curriculum Night, which Livanis declined to do. Because of this and the low performance ratings the previous school year, some teachers decided to boycott the event.

In 2015, Olga Livanis resigned as principal.

=== 2015 – 2026 ===
Mark Berkowitz succeeded Livanis as principal. In April 2020, Berkowitz resigned and accepted a position as Principal at Pelham Memorial High School located in Pelham, NY. Meaghan Lynch became the interim acting principal on July 1, 2020.

== Transportation ==
NEST+m is located on the Lower East Side of Manhattan and is accessible to several New York City Subway and bus routes. The school is within walking distance of the Second Avenue station serviced by the F train. Further away is the Delancey Street Station, serviced by the F, M and J trains. The school is also near the M9, M14D and M21 buses. Eligible NEST+m students qualify for yellow bus service or OMNY cards.

== Enrollment ==
=== Admission ===
NEST+m is open to all New York City residents. There are three main entrance points to NEST+m, for kindergartners, sixth graders and ninth graders. In kindergarten, students are admitted based on preschool teacher assessment, with priority given to siblings. 100 seats are available. Students in grades 1-4 can also apply, with admission based on report card grades. For middle school, 120 seats are available, with most being filled by students already attending NEST+m. 10 seats are reserved for students with disabilities. Admissions for students who are continuing on at NEST+m is automatic, and arriving students are admitted based on 4th grade report cards. 0-5 general education seats are typically available for new students. For ninth graders, 150 seats are available, with 34 reserved for students with disabilities. Students already attending NEST+m can get a guaranteed offer to NEST+m high school. For new students, 66% of seats are given to those who qualify for free or reduced lunch prices. Admissions is based half on grades and half on an essay submitted.

=== Demographics ===
As of the 2024-2025 school year, NEST+m had 1617 students enrolled from K-12. In the high school of 537 students, 35% are White, 32% are Asian, 15% are Hispanic and 7% are Black, with <1% Native American or Pacific Islander. In the K-8 of 1038 students, 41% are Asian, 36% are White, 7% are Hispanic, and 3% are Black, with <1% Native American or Pacific Islander.

== Notable alumni ==
- Hudson Yang, actor

== See also ==
- List of high schools in New York City
- List of public elementary schools in New York City
