= Ross Global Academy =

Defunct school in New York, United States

Coordinates: 40.724039°N 73.997743°W

Information
- Established: 2006
- Closed: 2011
- Grades: K-8
- Enrollment: 400

Ross Global Academy was a public charter school from 2006 to 2011 in Lower Manhattan, New York City, New York.

The school opened in September 2006 with more than 160 students and its enrollment eventually grew to 400. It was closed in 2011 by New York City and state officials for various reasons, including poor performance.

The school was developed in collaboration with New York University's Steinhardt School and Ross School in East Hampton, which follows a spiral curriculum designed by William Thompson and Ralph Abraham. The school was initially slated to be housed in the same building as the NEST+m school on the Lower East Side, a controversial decision which was eventually revised.

In its inception, the school was housed within the New York City Department of Education's headquarters, the Tweed Courthouse at 52 Chambers Street. The school began its 2006–2007 school year at full enrollment on September 4, 2006, with students in grades K, 1, 2, 6, and 7. It was a project of the Ross School in East Hampton. RGA was founded by Courtney Sale Ross, who is a philanthropist and the widow of Steve Ross, the former CEO of Time-Warner.

By 2009, RGA had expanded to serve grades K-8, and had moved to a new building on East 11th Street on the Lower East Side, which it stayed in until it closed in 2011. Despite reports of educational and behavioral issues, RGA asserted that the closure was due to a conflict of interest with the leadership of Girls Prep who were slated to occupy the building.
