= PS 158 =

Coordinates: 40°46′12.86″N 73°57′3.07″W

Public School #158
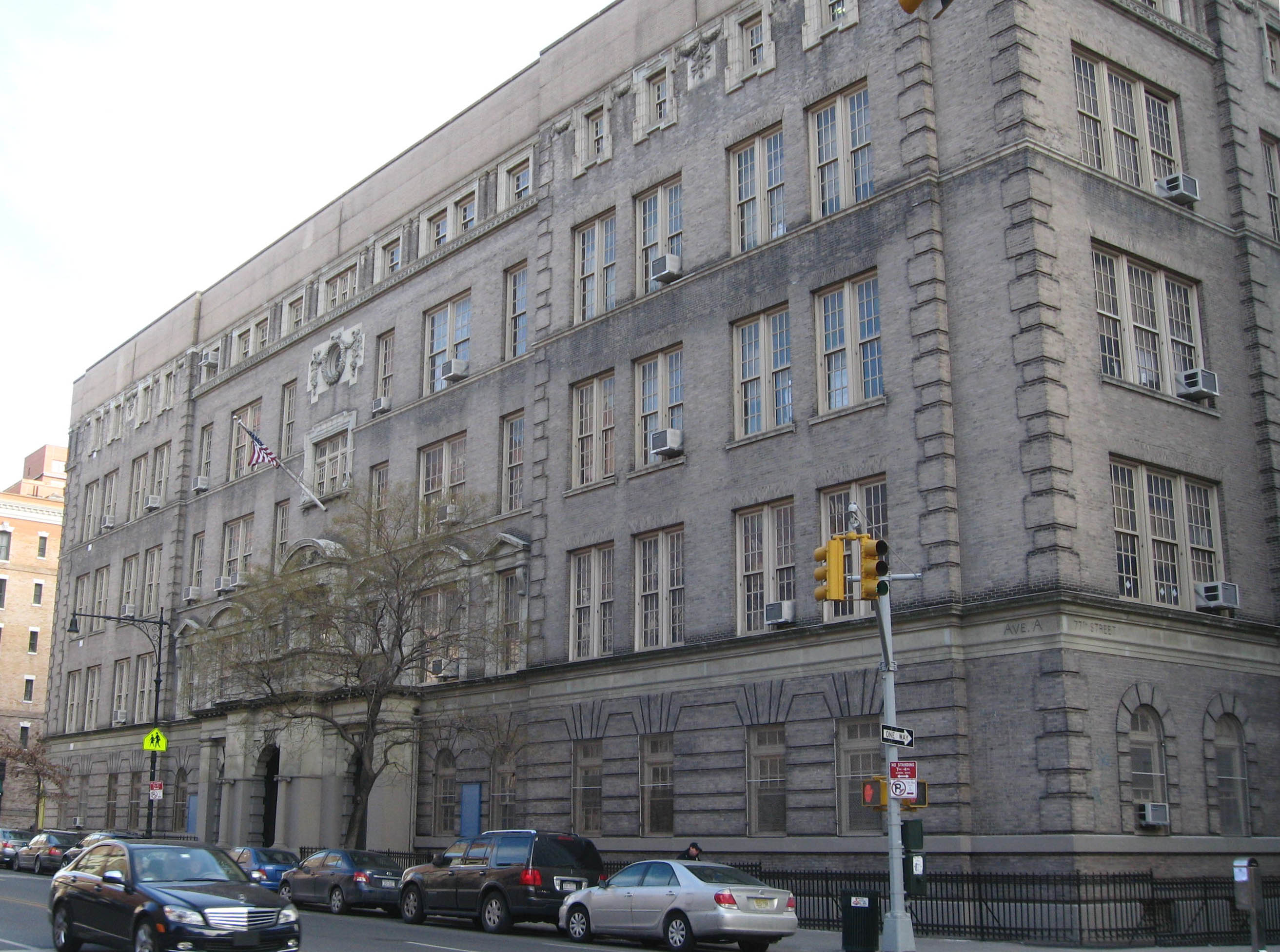
- York Avenue facade

Location
- 1458 York Avenue; New York City, New York 10075; United States

Information
- School type: Public school
- Established: 1898
- School district: 2
- Principal: Dina Ercolano
- Grades: Preschool – Fifth grade
- Enrollment: 720
- Campus type: Urban
- Mascot: Owl
- Information: (212) 879-2181
- Website: www.ps158.org

P.S. 158 (Public School #158), named the Bayard Taylor School, is a public elementary school in New York City. The school is located on the Upper East Side of Manhattan. It first opened in the mid-1890s. The school building occupies the entire breadth of York Avenue between 77th and 78th Street.

The school reports some of the highest test scores in New York City. Therefore, it is considered one of the best schools in New York City. It was one of the first schools in the city to adopt very stringent teaching requirements to adhere to nationally developed performance standards in the 1990s. 88% of the teachers have a master's degree or higher. In 2010, 96% of fifth grade students performed at or above standards on state and city tests in the subjects of English and mathematics. The school's mascot is the owl, perhaps not coincidentally one of the ancient symbols of wisdom. Its building was renovated in 2017.

== Notable alumni ==
- Stacy Keanan - Lawyer and Actress
- Mark Feuerstein - actor
- John Linnell - Singer and keyboardist for the rock band They Might Be Giants
- Cynthia Nixon - Tony- and two-time Emmy Award-winning actress

== See also ==
- List of public elementary schools in New York City
