= PS 41 =

Public elementary school in Manhattan, New York

Location
- 116 West 11th Street; New York 10011; United States; 40.7356°N 73.9993°W

Information
- Other names: Greenwich Village School; Public School 41
- School type: Zoned public elementary school
- Established: 1867
- School district: New York City Department of Education
- Principal: Michelle Amato
- Website: ps41.org
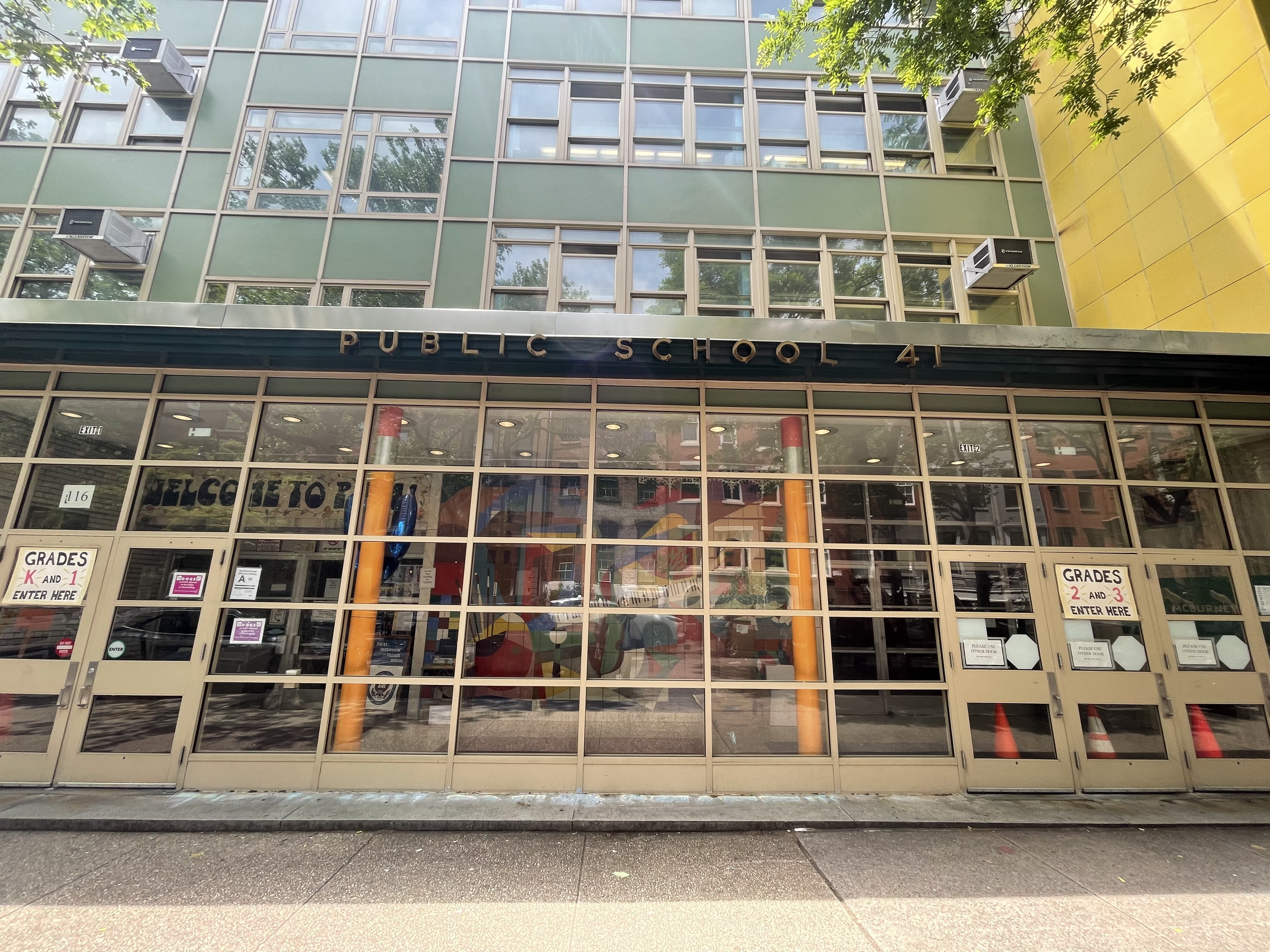
- Main entrance to P.S. 41, 2022.

Public School 41, also known as the Greenwich Village School, is a public school in Manhattan, New York City.

== History ==
PS 41 opened in 1867. When Grammar School No. 41 first opened, it was located by what is now the school yard entrance at Greenwich Avenue and Charles Street. At the time a girls’-only school, it was described by The New York Times as a “model of comfort and neatness” and “one of the finest school buildings in the city.”

Grammar School No. 41 was touted in the 1867 BOE Annual Report as having “been erected with great care,”and as “one of the most elegant and substantial School Houses yet erected." Over the years, the school became known for its academic excellence, frequently making headlines for the high number of its graduates who qualified for “Normal School” (i.e. those who qualify to teach school). In 1957, a new building replaced the original structure, designed by the New York City Board of Education's chief architect, Michael L. Radoslovich. In 2012 the school opened the first green roof on a New York City public school, using it for environmental education.

Now PS 41 serves students in grades 3-K through 5 from its designated neighborhood zoned area.

In 2021, PS 41 was recognized as a National Blue Ribbon School.

== Notable alumni ==
- Robert De Niro
- Sakina Jaffrey, actress
- Scarlett Johansson
- Max Kellerman
- Ayuo Takahashi, musician, composer, lyricist, singer,
- Michael Kimmelman, New York Times critic
- Alan Gerson, New York City Council member
- Bob Woodruff, American country music singer and songwriter
- Mitchell Whitfield, actor, one of the stars of My Cousin Vinny
- Adam Horovitz or King Ad-Rock, member of the Beastie Boys
- Vin Diesel
- Morena Baccarin
- James Kent, owner of Crown Shy and Saga
- Harry Chapin, noted singer/songwriter
- Cooper Hoffman, actor
