= Empowerment School =

An Empowerment School was a school using the Empowerment Support Organization of the New York City Department of Education (DOE). Eric Nadelstern was in charge.

== History ==
The program was founded in 2004 as a pilot program. Empowerment Schools were a class of schools which claimed to offer more autonomy in choosing a curriculum. Principals of Empowerment Schools had greater autonomy from the DOE in terms of management, instruction, and budget, if they agreed to meet performance goals. The claim was that the transfer of management duties from the DOE to the schools would allow the schools to operate with less bureaucracy, saving money. The DOE offered fewer centralized services, and passed more money on to the Empowerment Schools in increased budget, but charged the schools for services that had formerly been supplied for free.

In April 2006, 332 principals opted into the program. In the spring of 2007, the DOE required each school to choose a school support organization, to take effect for the 2007–2008 school year; the empowerment school program became one of those school support organizations.

At the program's peak in the 2007–2008 school year, there were 22 Empowerment School Networks, supporting 500 schools.

== See also ==
- Education in New York City
- Gifted education
- List of public elementary schools in New York City
- Specialized high schools in New York City
