= PS 9 Sarah Anderson School =

Elementary school in Manhattan, New York

Coordinates: 40°47′6.43″N 73°58′25.99″W

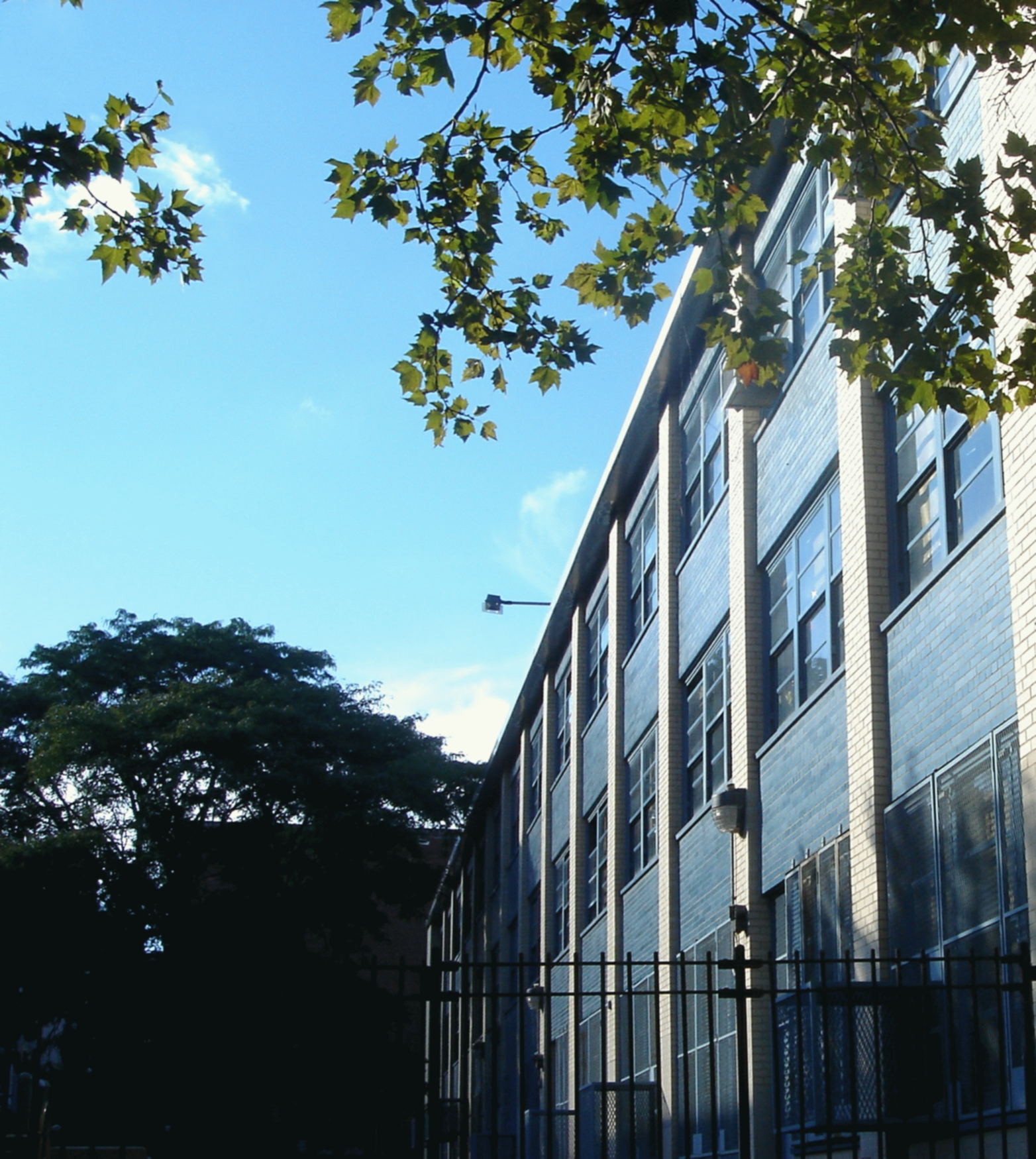
Blue glazed brick on the southside of the building (2007)

Public School 9, The Sarah Anderson School is a public elementary K–5 neighborhood catchment school that offers two programs: Renaissance and Gifted. Founded in 1830, P.S. 9 is located on the Upper West Side in Manhattan, New York City.

== School name ==
The Sarah Anderson School (PS 9) is named after Sarah Anderson (b. 7-31-1922 Birmingham, AL - d. 2-2-1981 Griffin, GA), a beloved school paraprofessional and parent for whom the Board of Education renamed PS 9 at a May 1981 memorial dedication.

In 1993, under Principal Joan Gutkin, PhD (1936–1997), PS 9 received magnet school funding for music and art and henceforth adopted the name, "Renaissance School of Music and Art." Upon the departure of Dr. Gutkin, and with the ebb and flow of funding for the arts, PS 9 uses both names, interchangeably.

== History ==
=== Original location ===
The school that became P.S. 9 was originally organized by the vestry of Saint Michael's Church (Episcopal) in the early 19th century. The vestry continued to operate the school in the Bloomingdale area until a law was enacted November 19, 1824 which barred church schools from receiving public school funding. On May 22, 1826, the Public School Society of New York acquired it; and, in July 1827, the Society paid $250 for a 100x100 foot tract at 82nd Street between 10th (Amsterdam) and 11th (West End) Avenues. On July 19, 1830, the Society completed the construction of a one-story clapboard school at 466 West End Avenue for $1,500, accommodating about 50 children. The Society transferred jurisdiction of the school to the Board of Education in July 1853.

In 1889, the New York Times published a letter to Mayor Hugh J. Grant citing the grim condition of the P.S. 9 building:

There was no visible plaster in the entire building. The wooden staircases and wood-lined stairways were only 29 inches wide. Large stoves and stovepipes beneath the stairs and elsewhere, used for warming the building, were dangerously close to the woodwork. The so-called passages were 30 inches wide. The building was devoid of any means of escape from the rear and devoid of a fire escape. Means of egress from the front was insufficient.

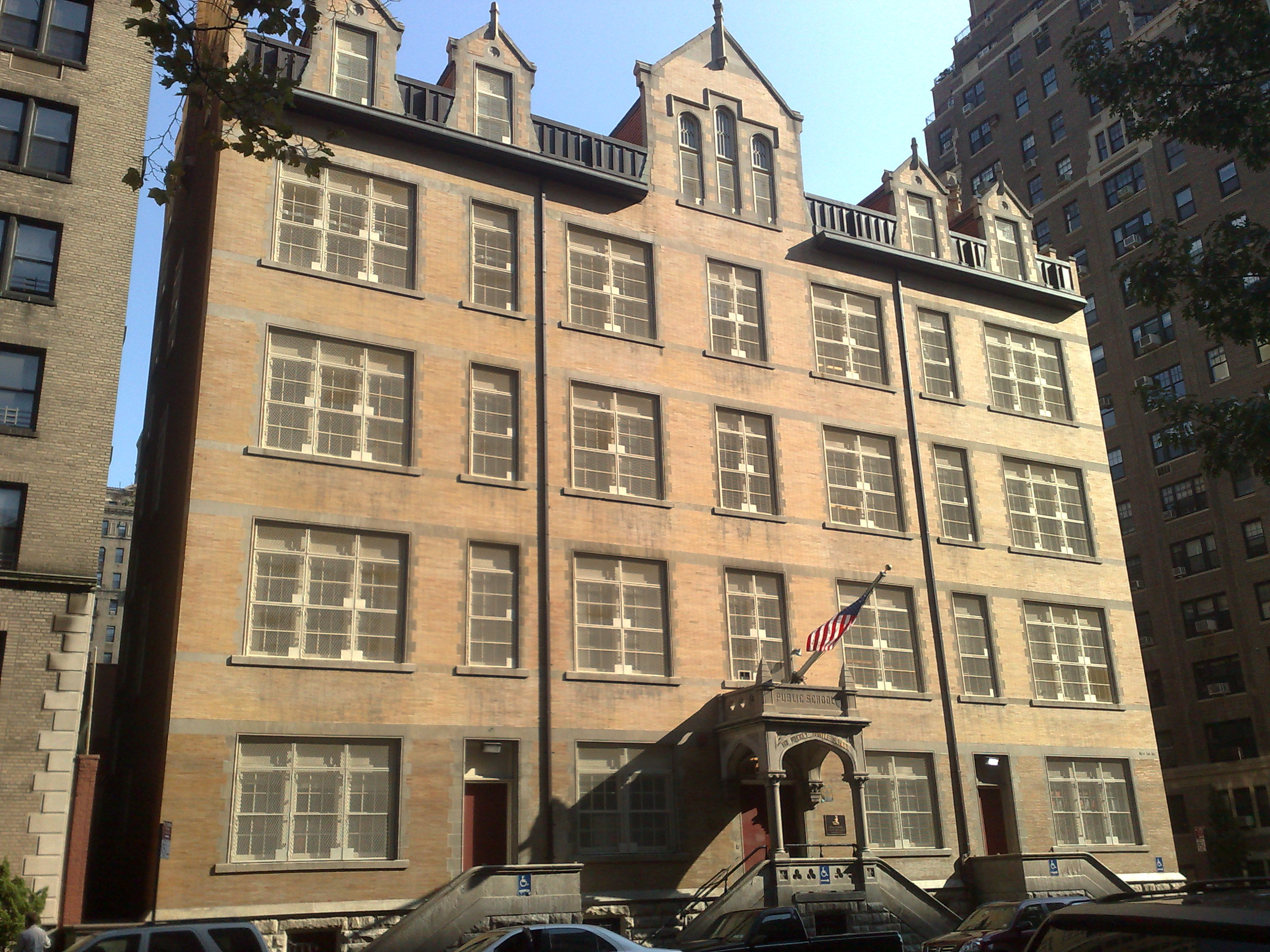
The school's old building at 466 West End Avenue, constructed in 1894-96

The next year (1890), the Board of Education demolished the building. From 1894 to 1896, the Board erected a modern school building on the same site equipped with electricity and ventilation, and designed by C. B. J. Snyder. Designed to blend with the neighborhood, the ecclesiastical English gothic structure was a style prevalent in schools built by Trinity Church.

On January 26, 1916, during a graduation ceremony, P.S. 9 was named after the late John Jasper. Jasper was an educator who had served at P.S. 9 as a teacher in 1857 and as its principal from 1867 to 1897. He went on to become Assistant Superintendent of Schools then, in 1898, Borough Associate Superintendent of Schools for Manhattan and the Bronx.

In 1961, David H. Moskowitz, the Deputy Superintendent for Research and Evaluation for New York City Schools, reported a high transient rate at several elementary schools, including P.S. 9, which ranged from 90 to 99% during the 1959–1960 school year.

The former P.S. 9 building is now the home of the Mickey Mantle School P.S. 811M, serving children with disabilities.

=== Current building ===
The School Board and Superintendent John Jacob Theobald approved the West 84th Street site for P.S. 9 on July 18, 1962, at a School Board meeting held at Headquarters, 110 Livingston Street, Brooklyn. The new building was part of plan to spend one billion dollars on New York City school construction over a ten-year period that began in the late 1950s.

Simultaneously building the campuses of P.S. 9 and Brandeis High School (across the street, between 84th and 85th Streets) served a secondary purpose. It was part of a larger concerted pilot project by Mayor Robert Ferdinand Wagner’s "All-Out War on the Forces of Crime." West 84th Street, between Amsterdam and Columbus, had been dubbed "The Worst Block in New York." The City relocated 800 of 1000 families from that block so that 20 condemned buildings could be demolished. Those buildings represented the recent filing of more than 2,300 recent building violations totaling $4,100 in fines to 18 landlords by the Housing Court.

For a cost of $2.4 million, Rand Construction Company erected the current three-story building at 100 West 84th Street at Columbus. Under Arthur G. Paletta, Director of Architecture, the BOE Bureau of Design drafted the architectural blueprints. The facility opened on March 12, 1965, to 800 children in grades pre-K to 5. Retaining the name, the BOE dedicated the new building as the "John Jasper School P.S. 9".

Sometimes referred to as "P.S. 174" during the planning and construction phase, the building had been slated to open September 1964. But while preparing the foundation, the BOE engineers and general contractor discovered an underground stream. They had overlooked two critical historic maps, the Viele Map of 1865 and the Townsend MacCoun map of 1909, both showing an underground stream that starts at the school site – the block bounded by 83rd & 84th Streets and 9th & 10th Avenues – joining other streams, flowing southeast under Central Park and emptying into the East River between 74th and 75th Streets. Failure to check the Viélé and MacCoun maps is considered a cardinal sin for construction engineers. According to Eugene Edward Hult, Superintendent of Design, Construction and Physical Plant for the BOE, the underground stream was "more like a pond," about two feet wide; there was earth but no rock, which required the redesign for a new foundation. Construction was held-up from March 15 to August 6, 1963. Along with a change-order, the mistake cost the BOE an additional $100,000. The underground stream flows in an opposite direction to the surface watershed, which flows to the Hudson.

Three-story windowless wall facing Columbus Avenue (2007)

In the 1950s, many architects used the older red brick for apartment buildings — although its use in public housing projects gave it an unwelcome tinge for the luxury market. Nonetheless, all-white brick buildings became standard for supposed elegance, but there was also a chromatic undercurrent. The architects of public schools in the mid-1950s began incorporating color into their buildings, like the yellow-glazed brick on PS 41. The use of blue bricks at P.S. 34, erected in 1956 at 12th Street and Avenue D, outraged City Controller Lawrence Ettore Gerosa, who, in well-publicized hearings in 1958, accused the BOE of wasteful extravagance.

Transforming the block, without any effort to blend in, white bricks on the new P.S. 9 face east to Columbus Avenue and west to the schoolyard. Facing the north and south to the streets the blue glazed bricks frame the classroom windows — inviting, perhaps subliminal of the Santa Fe blue-framed windows that keep evil spirits from entering, the white bricks suggestive of stucco. The building is strongly modernist — functional, "ornamentation is a crime." The three-story wall facing Columbus is windowless.

Two then contemporary events in history influenced one aspect of the building's architecture. In 1957 the Soviets launched the Sputnik satellite. 1962 was the year of the Cuban Missile Crisis. Hence the building has an antiquated fallout shelter.

==== Permanent art installation ====
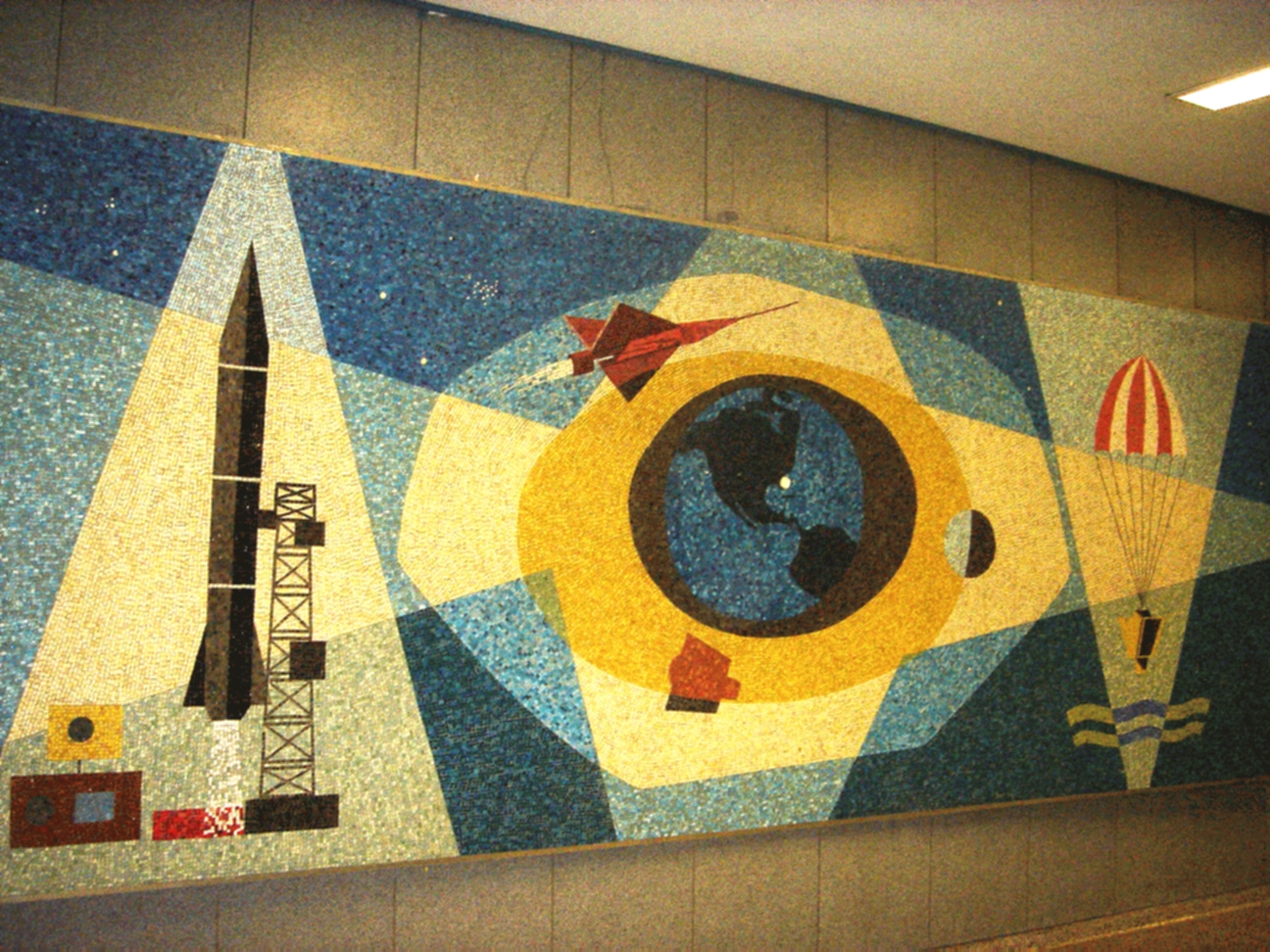
Man in Space, glass mosaic, Vincent Cavallaro, 1965 (2007 photo)

The auditorium foyer (also known as "the Well") features an 8 x 21 foot glass mosaic, Man In Space, (completed 1965) by Vincent Cavallaro, commissioned in 1963 for the building by Public Art for Public Schools. At the time of the commission, NASA had completed seven one-man space missions under the Mercury Program. The mosaic commemorates not only what was then the frontier of space exploration, but also the importance of science education for children. Cavallaro, a painter, sculptor and abstract artist, created many works related to space exploration; one in particular was a bronze sculpture by the same title, Man In Space, (1967), located at Junior High School 88, Brooklyn.

==== Changing neighborhood ====
On March 30, 1972, in an effort to extend Mayor Wagner's fight against crime in the neighborhood, Mayor John V. Lindsay moved the New York City Police Department 20th Precinct from West 68th Street to 120 West 82nd Street (one block from the school) into a newly built $2.8 million three-story building.

== Principals ==
- Ms. Bernadette Castronuovo O'Brien (August 1984 – August 1989)
- Dr. Joan Gutkin (1989 – 1997)
- Diane Brady (1997 – 2015)
- Kate Witzke (2015 – 2023)
- Stephanie Saunders (2023 – present)
