= Public Prep =

Single-sex charter school

Public Prep is an organization that operates single-sex charter schools in New York City.

== Grades offered ==
- Girls Prep Lower East Side Elementary- serves grades K-4
- Girls Prep Lower East Side Middle- serves grades 5-8
- Girls Prep Bronx Elementary- serves grades K-5
- Girls Prep Bronx Middle- serves grades 6-7 for the 2015-16 school year and will grow a grade each year through 8th grade
- Boys Prep Bronx Elementary- serves grades K-2 for the 2015-16 school year and will grow a grade each year through 8th grade
- PrePrep: the Joan Ganz Cooney Early Learning Program- serves four-year-olds

== Academics ==
The schools implement a curriculum aligned with the Common Core State Standards.

Public Prep is in the second year of a three-year timeline for the Curriculum Development Initiative focused on establishing an interdisciplinary, knowledge-based curriculum in all content areas — including fitness and the arts.

Beginning in Kindergarten, students are taught science five days a week by a dedicated science teacher. In the 14-15 school year, more than 75 students engaged in science and/or engineering programming at Cornell University, West Point, the US Naval Academy, i3 STEM Camps, and the Liberty Science Center.

Federal law forbids gender discrimination. However, the U.S. Department of Education has provided nonregulatory guidance to the effect that if comparable facilities are provided for both boys and girls then single-sex schools are permitted, and comparable facilities are, both at Excellence Charter School of Bedford Stuyvesant and in other schools in the city, including for boys only. State law allows single-sex schools (Education Law subdiv. 2854(2)).

== Student demographics ==
=== Ethnic and racial demography ===
School	Ethnicity	Eligible for Free/Reduced Lunch	Receive Special Education Services	English Language Learners
Girls Prep Lower East Side Elementary	Hispanic 55%, African American 40%, Asian, White, & Other 5%	84%	16%	3%
Girls Prep Lower East Side Middle	Hispanic 47%, African American 48%, Asian, White, & Other 5%	72%	17%	1%
Girls Prep Bronx Elementary	Hispanic 61%, African American 37%, Asian, White, & Other 2%	85%	15%	7%
Girls Prep Bronx Middle	Hispanic 37%, African American 61%, Asian, White, & Other 2%	79%	15	5%
Boys Prep Bronx Elementary	Hispanic 50%, African American 47%, Asian, White, & Other 3%	89%	21%	7%
PrePrep	Hispanic 47%, African American 48%, Asian, White, & Other 5%	78%	13%	2%

== Management ==
The Chief Executive Officer is Janelle Bradshaw.

Public Prep is governed by a Board of Trustees; the Public Prep Network Board is the charter management organization that supports and manages the schools, while the Public Prep Academies Board is the separate board that oversees individual schools.

=== Finances ===
Public Prep schools are tuition-free. Charter schools are provided public per pupil revenue reimbursements. It is the second year of incremental increases of charter school per pupil expenditure in New York City. Public Prep schools receive $13,877 per pupil in FY 15-16, and are expected to receive $14,027 per pupil in FY 16-17.

=== Founding ===
Girls Prep was founded in 2005 by Eric Grannis, Bryan Lawrence, and Miriam Lewis Raccah. Public Prep was established in 2009 to support Girls Prep Lower East Side, its replication school in the Bronx, and future public schools.

=== Professional affiliation ===
Public Prep (as Girls Prep) is a member of the National Coalition of Girls' Schools.

== Admissions and costs ==
Public Prep schools are tuition-free.

Students are accepted by a random lottery. Enrollment preference is given to applicants with siblings enrolled in the Public Prep school to which they are applying, if they live in the district of the school to which they are applying, or to applicants who reside in approved NYCHA Housing Developments.

== Results ==
=== State tests ===
The school's management reported, "100% of Girls Prep 3rd and 4th graders scored advanced or proficient on the New York State math & science exams", and "98% of third grade students and 92% of fourth grade students scored advanced or proficient on the New York State ELA ["English Language Arts"] exam." As comparisons, it reported, "[i]n Community School District 1 where Girls Prep [in Manhattan] is located, 91.9% of third graders and 82.8% of fourth graders scored advanced or proficient on the math exam. On the ELA exam, 70.5% of District 1 third graders and 69.5% of fourth graders scored advanced or proficient. In New York City, 91.1% of third graders and 84.4% of fourth graders scored advanced or proficient in Math while 69% of third and fourth graders scored advanced or proficient in ELA."

In 2008, every 3rd and 4th grade student—100%—scored as proficient in math, while 92.0% of 4th graders and 97.7% of 3rd graders scored as proficient in English. By comparison, the whole district did less well, the proficient in English being only 69.5% of 4th graders and 70.5% of 3rd graders and in math 82.8% of 4th graders and 91.9% of 3rd graders. The difference between district-wide scores and Girls Prep scores thus ranges from 8.1% to 27.2%, all of them in Girls Prep students' favor.
