= William Steinway =

German-American businessman (1835–1896)

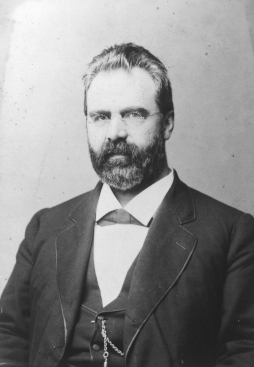
- Born: Wilhelm Steinweg; March 5, 1835; Seesen, Duchy of Brunswick
- Died: November 30, 1896 (aged 61); New York City, U.S.
- Resting place: Green-Wood Cemetery
- Occupation: Businessman
- Known for: Expanding and marketing Steinway & Sons

William Steinway, also known as Wilhelm Steinway (born Wilhelm Steinweg; March 5, 1835 – November 30, 1896), son of Steinway & Sons founder Henry E. Steinway, was a businessman and civic leader who was influential in the development of Astoria, New York.

== Early life and education ==
Steinway was born in Seesen, Brunswick, Germany, the fourth son of Henry Engelhard Steinway. In Germany, he received an elementary education and was also given instruction in languages and music. He then became an apprentice in a piano factory, where he spent two years.

== Career ==
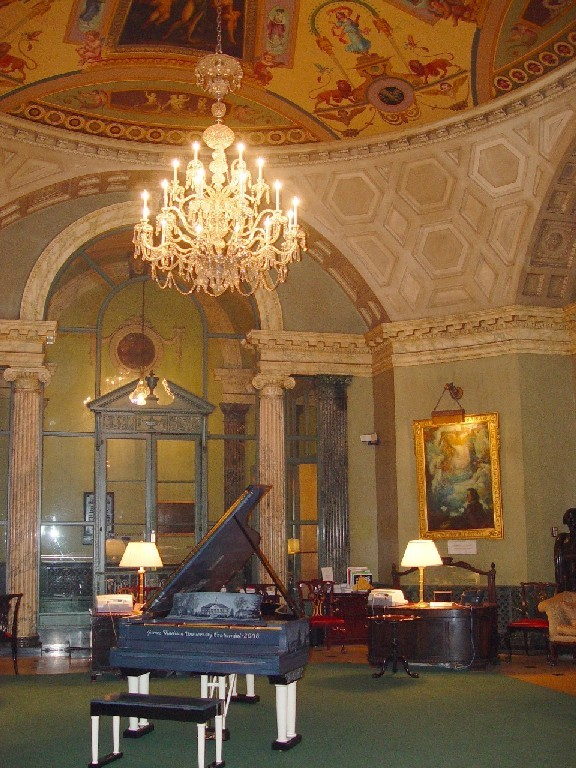
The rotunda of the Steinway Hall on 57th St. in New York City, with artist Mia LaBerge's Madison Bluestone art case piano in the foreground

=== Steinway & Sons ===
He came to the United States with his father and brothers in 1850. With his father and his brothers Charles and Henry, he founded the firm of Steinway & Sons in 1853. In 1865 they were joined by Charles F. Tretbar who became William's close confidant in both business and his personal life. In 1876, he became the official head of the firm; however, he had effectively made the decisions since 1871 after his father died. In regard to representation, since 1860 when he was the speaker to inaugurate the new plant at 4th Avenue/52nd Street, New York City. In 1866, Steinway erected Steinway Hall to make a place for the exhibition of the highest musical skill. It was a huge success for the company. He also founded the Steinway Concert & Artist Department, which is still working today.

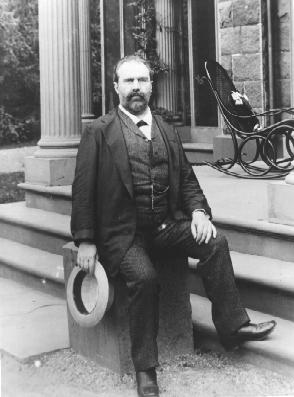
William Steinway at the porch of the Steinway Mansion

In 1870, after purchasing property from the widow of Benjamin Pike, Jr., which included a mansion that would house his family during the summertime and later bear his name as the Steinway Mansion, William began buying new property surrounding the mansion to build a company town, Steinway Village, on 440 acres (1.8 km^{2}) in northern Astoria, New York. Avoiding the crowded streets and labor problems associated with operating in Manhattan, he directed the construction of the Steinway Piano Factory on this land, a large facility still in operation today. Near the factory was the aforementioned housing for his workers, a church, a library, a kindergarten, and a public trolley line. In 1929, a resort and amusement park area that Steinway developed just east of Astoria, in North Beach at Bowery Bay, was converted into North Beach Airport, later renamed LaGuardia Airport.

His successor as head of the company was Charles Herman Steinway.

=== Daimler cars ===
Steinway also became involved in Daimler AG's first venture into American markets. Through his connections with a designer and Daimler confidant Wilhelm Maybach, Steinway met Gottlieb Daimler during a stay in Germany in 1888. Their conversations would invariably revolve around one subject: the production of Daimler engines in America. Steinway, like Daimler, quite rightly believed there was a bright future for the internal combustion engine and automobile. After William Steinway returned to America, plans quickly materialized. On September 29, 1888, Daimler Motor Company of New York was founded and initially produced gasoline and petroleum engines for stationary and marine applications. Steinway and Daimler also started seriously considering the production of automobiles in America, as shipping costs and customs duties prevented the importation of highly coveted "old-world" automobiles. From 1892 until c. 1896–97, the "American Daimler" was produced in the premises of the Steinway Astoria plant, full copies of the German cars.

Following Steinway's early death in 1896, his heirs weren't convinced about the project and sold all their shares to the General Electric Company in 1898. The factory was renamed Daimler Manufacturing Company. Nonetheless, the hand-polished wood inside the Daimler AG company's luxury top brand cars named Maybach is still (as of 2010) made by Steinway's factory in Hamburg, Germany.

== Public transit ==
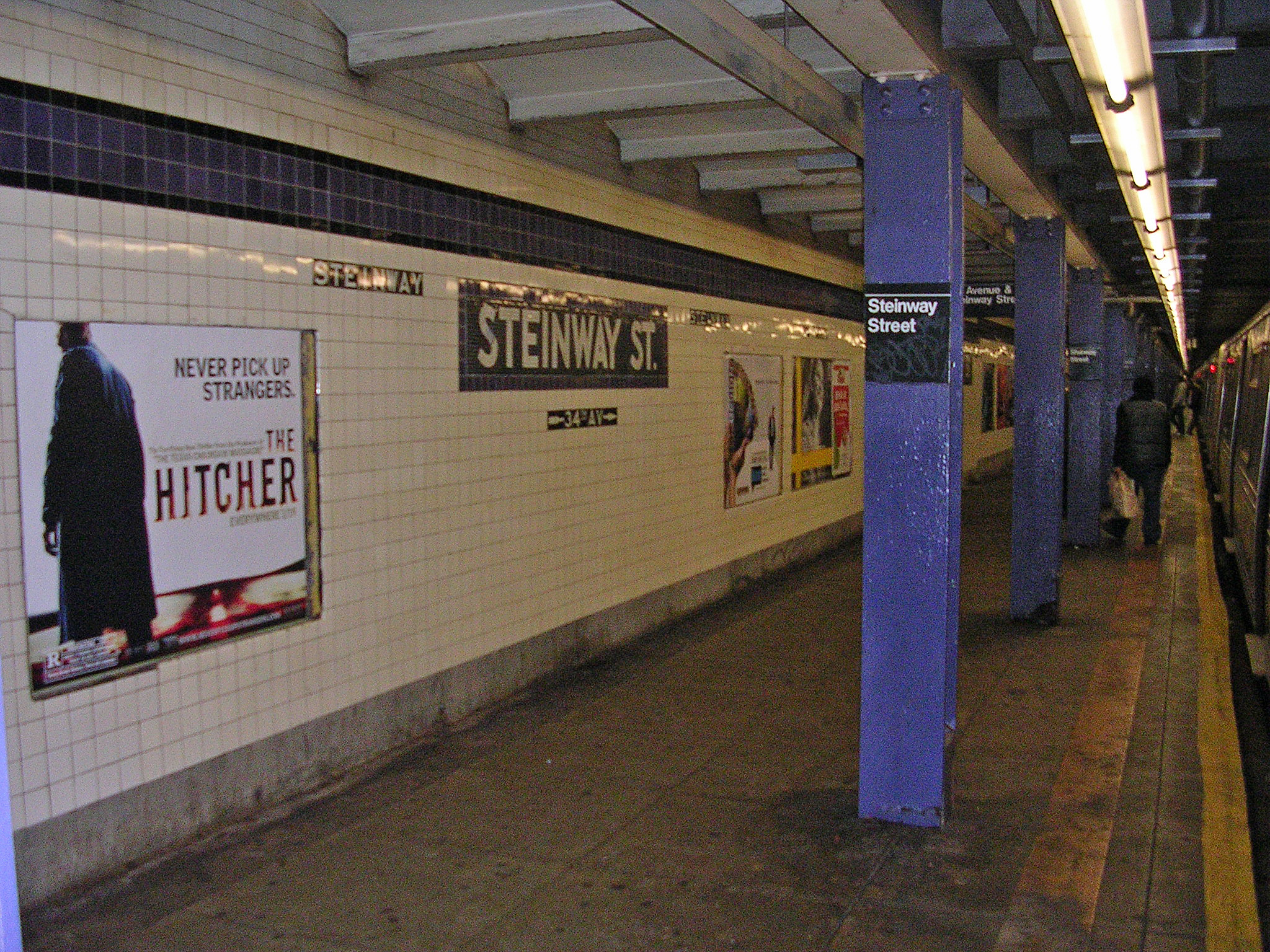
Steinway Street Station

During the 1890s, Steinway began a project to extend his company town's horse-drawn trolley line under the East River and into midtown Manhattan. This project would eventually lead to the IRT Flushing Line. Although he died before the completion of the project, the tunnels that were dug under the East River were named the Steinway Tunnels after him and his contributions to the project. The dirt removed from the tunnels was formed into a small island in the middle of the East River, now called U Thant Island. Steinway served as head of the New York Subway Commission, the group that planned the New York City Subway network.

== Personal life ==
Steinway married Regina Roos in Buffalo, New York in April 1861. He was 26 and she was 17, and reportedly the couple were deeply in love. The marriage lasted 16 years and included a series of affairs, which, according to his personal diaries, caused him considerable distress. While married to Steinway, Regina became pregnant six times, three of which ended in miscarriage or stillbirth. One son was illegitimate and moved with his mother to France when she divorced in 1876. Steinway later remarried.

== Death and legacy ==
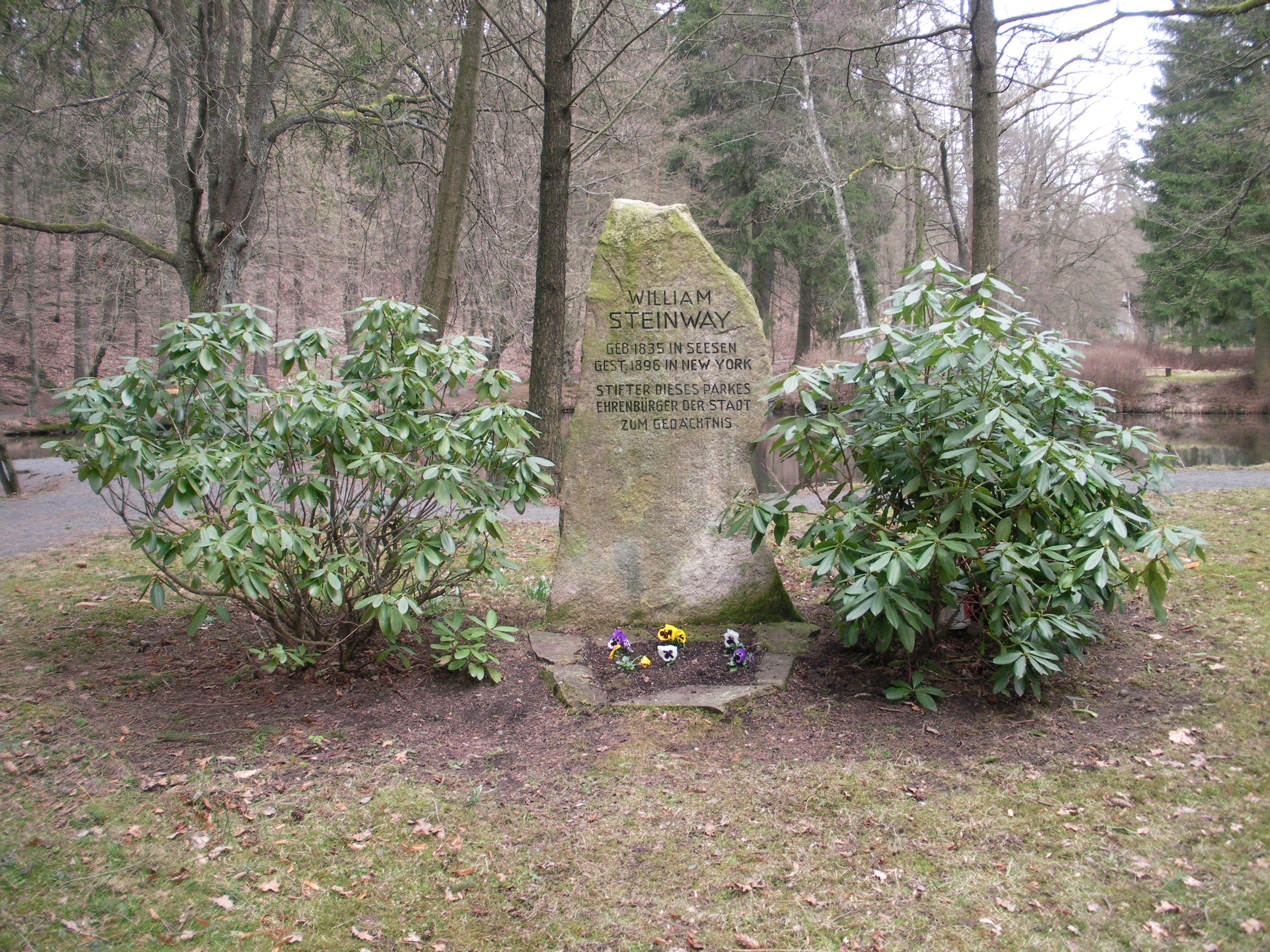
Steinway memorial, in the town of his birth Seesen, Brunswick

William Steinway died on November 30, 1896, and was buried at Green-Wood Cemetery.40.65155°N 73.9938°W

Main Street in Astoria has been renamed Steinway Street in his honor, and today a station on the IND Queens Boulevard Line (E, F, M, and R trains) is named Steinway Street.

The Smithsonian's National Museum of American History launched an online edition of "The William Steinway Diary" in December 2010 to coincide with a special display of the diary. The exhibition, titled "A Gateway to the 19th Century: The William Steinway Diary, 1861–1896," was on view in the ⠀⠀Albert H. Small⠀⠀ Documents Gallery from Dec. 17, 2010, through April 8, 2011. In the diaries, Steinway documented more than 36 years of his life through near-daily notes in nine volumes and some 2,500 pages, beginning eight days after the first shots of the Civil War were fired and three days before his wedding. The exhibition of the diary included select diary passages, Steinway family photographs, maps, advertisements, and documentation of his role in the creation of the New York City subway and the company town of Steinway in Queens, N.Y.

Recognizing the diary's historical significance, the late Henry Ziegler Steinway, Steinway's grandson and former president of Steinway & Sons, donated the diary to the museum in 1996. A complete transcription of the diary alongside high-resolution scans of each handwritten page is available on "The William Steinway Diary" website from the Smithsonian National Museum of American History. The site provides a detailed look at Steinway's firsthand account of the period's financial panics, labor unrest, and rise of the German immigrant class. The primary source material is contextualized with more than 100 images from Steinway family archives and related essays.

== See also ==
- Steinway & Sons
- Steinway Mansion
