= Virginia State Route 4 =

State highway in Mecklenburg County, Virginia, US

State Route 4
- Buggs Island Road

Route information
- Maintained by VDOT
- Length: 11.02 mi (17.73 km)
- Existed: 1952–present

Major junctions
- South end: NC SR 1200 near Palmer Springs
- North end: US 58 / SR 674 near Midway

Location
- Country: United States
- State: Virginia
- Counties: Mecklenburg

Highway system
- Virginia Routes; Interstate; US; Primary; Secondary; Byways; History; HOT lanes
← SR 3	→ SR 5

State Route 4 (SR 4) is a primary state highway in the U.S. state of Virginia. Known as Buggs Island Road, the state highway runs 11.02 miles (17.73 km) from the North Carolina state line near Palmer Springs north to U.S. Route 58 (US 58) near Midway. SR 4 connects US 58 with John H. Kerr Dam, which impounds the Roanoke River to form Kerr Lake. The state highway was assigned concurrent with the construction of the dam and reservoir in the early 1950s.

The entire length of SR 4 is part of U.S. Bicycle Route 1.

== Route description ==
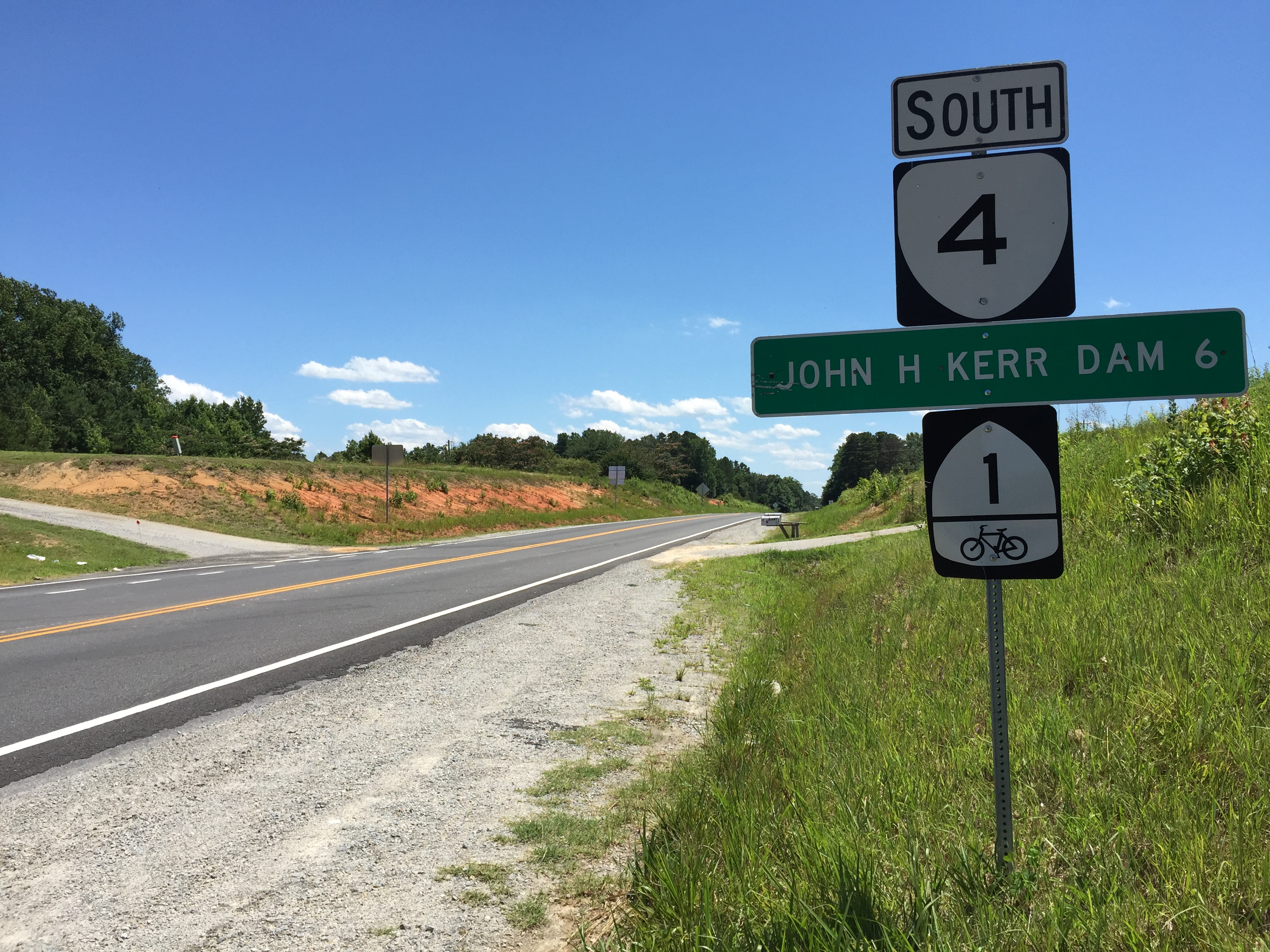
View south at the north end of SR 4 at US 58 and SR 674 near Midway

SR 4 begins at the North Carolina state line southwest of the community of Palmer Springs. The roadway continues south as NC 1200 (Drewry Virginia Line Road) toward Middleburg. The state highway heads north to the east of several arms of Kerr Lake. SR 4 veers northwest and follows the shore of the lake to John H. Kerr Dam, on top of which the state highway crosses the Roanoke River. The road on top of the dam, which separates Kerr Lake from Lake Gaston, is maintained by the United States Army Corps of Engineers. The state highway passes through the hamlet of Castle Heights and crosses Kettles Creek and Allen Creek before reaching its northern terminus at US 58 near Midway between South Hill and Boydton. The roadway continues north as SR 674 (Wooden Bridge Road).

== History ==
SR 4 was added to the primary state highway system in 1952; the dam was completed that same year.

== Major intersections ==
The entire route is in Mecklenburg County.

Location	mi	km	Destinations	Notes
	0.00	0.00	Drewry Virginia Line Road (SR 1200)	North Carolina state line; southern terminus
	4.53– 5.06	7.29– 8.14	John H. Kerr Dam (Roanoke River)	
	11.02	17.73	US 58 / SR 674 (Wooden Bridge Road) – Boydton, South Hill	Northern terminus
1.000 mi = 1.609 km; 1.000 km = 0.621 mi
