= James Solomon Russell =

American clergyman and educator (1857-1935)

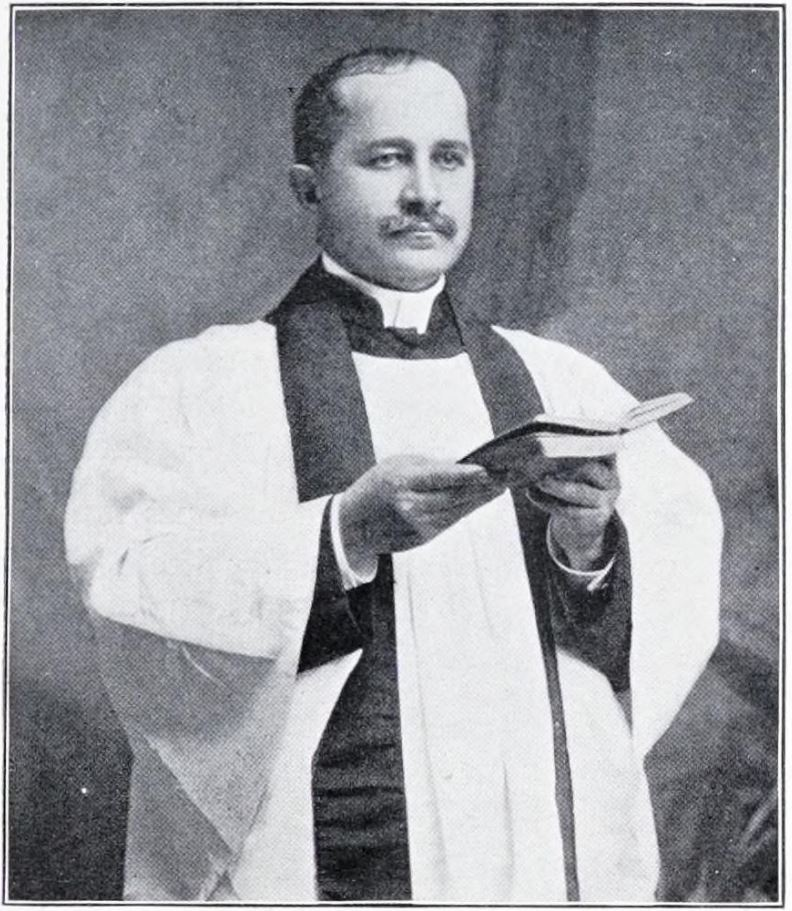
- Born: 20 December 1857; Mecklenburg County, Virginia
- Died: March 28, 1935 (aged 77); Lawrenceville, Virginia
- Occupation: Priest
- Spouse: Virginia Michigan Morgan

James Solomon Russell (20 December 1857 – 28 March 1935), born enslaved in Mecklenburg County, Virginia, shortly before the American Civil War, was an Episcopal priest and educator. He founded Saint Paul Normal and Industrial School, which later became Saint Paul's College, a historically black college in Lawrenceville, Virginia. He declined two elections to become bishop in order to continue serving as the college's director.

== Early and family life ==
James Russell was born on 20 December 1857 to Araminta, an enslaved African-American woman on the Hendrick plantation in Mecklenburg County, Virginia. His enslaved father, Solomon Russell, worked on the Russell plantation across the border in Warren County, North Carolina.

After the Union victory in the American Civil War and the abolition of slavery, the senior Russell rejoined his family in Mecklenburg County. They began sharecropping on a plantation in Palmer Springs. James began attending a local school whose schoolmaster allowed tuition to be paid in labor and farm products. The schoolmaster and superintendent encouraged him to continue his education.

In 1974, Russell was admitted to the Hampton Normal and Agricultural Institute (later Hampton University. The historically black college had been founded in the 1860s. He worked to support himself, and took multiple breaks during his education to earn more money.

After a year, Russell began teaching near home and worked when the college was not in session. As part of his elementary school curriculum, Russell required students to recite the Apostles' Creed daily. A local Episcopalian matron gave him a Book of Common Prayer, and Russell decided to become a member of the Episcopalian denomination.

Russell's mother had long dreamed of her son becoming a priest and encouraged his education and clerical aspirations. Mrs. Pattie Hicks Buford of Lawrenceville, the county seat of Brunswick County, and who had been educating blacks since before the Civil War, brought Russell's ambition to the attention of Bishop Francis McNeece Whittle. He sent a local priest to Hampton to investigate and secured Russell's admission in 1878 to the newly created Bishop Payne Divinity School in Petersburg.

== Career ==
For four years, Russell studied and worked closely with Rev. Giles Buckner Cooke, a former Confederate officer who was educating African Americans. Russell became his protégé, and Cooke asked the younger man to preside at his own funeral (unfortunately, Cooke outlived Russell, so that duty was performed by Russell's son). Cooke expelled a fellow student who also later became a priest, George Freeman Bragg.

Bishop Whittle ordained Russell a deacon on March 9, 1882, and sent him as a missionary back to Mecklenburg County. He worked in Lawrenceville, initially holding separate services for African Americans at St. Andrew's, the majority white Episcopal Church.

The following year, the diocese authorized funds to build a church for his Black parishioners, and to buy a horse to aid in his missionary travels. He was ordained as a priest in 1887.

In January 1883, Russell and his wife began teaching African Americans in a room at the tiny new church. In 1888, through a legacy of the Rev. Saul of Philadelphia, they bought another building. With that, Russell founded Saint Paul Normal and Industrial School.

Due to his enthusiasm and aggressive fund-raising, it expanded its enrollment and curriculum. He retired as Principal and Chaplain in 1929, nine years after his wife's death. The college's trustees elected his son James Alvin Russell, who had also been ordained, to succeed him.

Meanwhile, in 1893, Rev. Russell was named Archdeacon of the newly formed Diocese of Southern Virginia. He was charged with working among African Americans to plant more Episcopal churches. As a result of his ministry, the number of African American churches in his diocese (the newly formed Diocese of Southern Virginia) had increased from none to 37, with more than 2000 communicants.

He later became the first African American to be named to the Board of Missions of the Episcopal Church, and served in that capacity from 1923 to 1931. In 1917, Russell was elected as Suffragan Bishop of Arkansas, but declined the honor in order to continue his work at the school. He also declined the offer to become Suffragan Bishop of North Carolina. As long anticipated, in 1919, the Diocese of Southwestern Virginia was created from the relatively new Diocese of Southern Virginia, and Lawrenceville became part of the new diocese.

In 1904, inspired by Booker T. Washington, Russell founded an annual farmers' conference. He urged African-American farmers to stay out of debt and to vote. But the white-dominated Virginia legislature passed amendments Constitution on 1902 instituted poll taxes and Jim Crow Laws had begun.

Archdeacon Russell was awarded an honorary degree from the Virginia Theological Seminary (the first African American thus honored) in 1917. In 1922 he received an honorary doctorate in laws from Monrovia College. He was also named Knight Commander of the Humane Order of African Redemption by the President of Liberia. In 1929 he won the Harmon Award for distinguished achievement.

== Personal life ==
In December 1882, Russell married Virginia Michigan Morgan of Petersburg. The couple eventually had five sons and three daughters together.

== Death and legacy ==
James Solomon Russell died at the President's house in Lawrenceville on March 28, 1935, after an extended illness. He was buried at Saint Paul's cemetery.

His son Rev. J. Alvin Russell continued to run the St. Paul College with his wife Nellie Pratt Russell (an incorporator of the Alpha Kappa Alpha sorority), and a board of trustees. His eldest daughter Araminta served as its registrar (800 students were enrolled the year of his death) until her death in 1937.

Archdeacon Russell's autobiography, Adventure in Faith, was published in 1935, the year of his death. A street in the developing Aberdeen Gardens neighborhood in Hampton, Virginia was named after him circa 1937.

The historically black college developed financial problems after the successes of the American Civil Rights Movement, as some students began to attend other colleges previously closed to them. Accreditation problems in 2012 led college officials to seek a merger with another college, but they were unable to achieve this. St. Paul's College closed in 2013, after 125 years of service.

In 1995, the Diocese of Southern Virginia added James Solomon Russell to its liturgical commemorations on the anniversary of his death. The General Convention extended this honor to all of the Episcopal Church.

A middle school in Lawrenceville, Virginia, is named after the pioneering educator and missionary.
