= Amelia Tilghman =

American journalist, vocalist, teacher (1856–1931)

Amelia Louise Tilghman
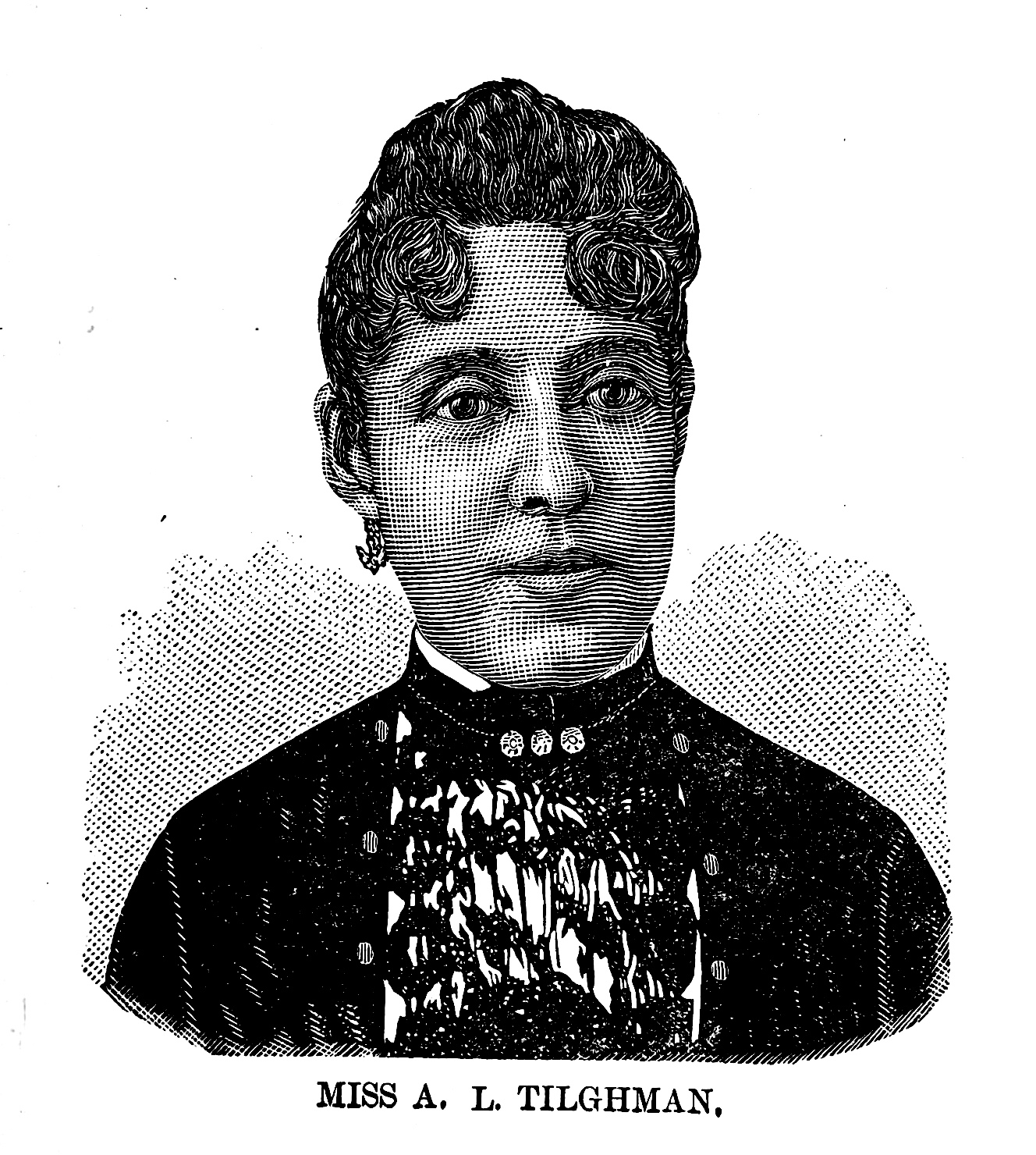
- Born: 6 September 1856; District of Columbia, U.S.
- Died: 12 December 1931 (aged 75); District of Columbia, U.S.
- Other names: Amelia Louise Tiligman, A. L. Tilghman
- Education: Howard University
- Occupations: Pianist, teacher, journalist, newspaper publisher, activist

Amelia Louise Tilghman (surname also spelled Tiligman; September 6, 1856 – December 12, 1931) (pronounced "TILL man") was an American pianist, teacher, journalist, and activist, She founded the first African-American journal devoted to music, The Musical Messenger, published from 1886 to 1891.

== Early life ==
Amelia Tilghman was born on September 6, 1856, in District of Columbia. She was the eldest daughter of Margaret Ann Reynolds (1819–1903) and Henry Hyland Tilgman (1811–1900), who grew up in a free black community class along with her younger sister. As a result, from her parents' social class, Amelia Tilghman was awarded the chance to grow up in the comforts amongst those who qualified as the black middle class in the Washington, District of Columbia.

Tilghman's family was involved in the church, which nurtured Amelia's musical talents in signing and piano. The beauty of Amelia Tilghman's voice reportedly moved many figures including Bishop Daniel Alexander Payne of the African Methodist Episcopal Church (A.M.E.). It has been reported that Bishop Daniel Alexander Payne even conveyed, "That child's parents had better spend a hundred dollars on her voice now than leave her a fortune when they die." Unfortunately, there is little available information surrounding her early years of music development.

Tilghman enrolled in the Normal School of Howard University and graduated in 1870. She then accepted a full-time job as a teacher in the black Georgetown public schools in 1870. After fourteen years, she relocated to Boston where she studied music pedagogy with Samuel Jamieson (1855–1930) at the Boston Conservatory of Music, though she never graduated with a degree.

In addition to her work as a teacher, Tilghman pursued a career as a pianist. She performed at Steinway Hall in Manhattan, New York, in 1880 and was described by a reviewer as "a musical star of the first magnitude." The following year, she was the invited soloist at Saengerfest, a festival at the Grand Opera House in Louisville, Kentucky. There, she heard a choral work of William Batchelder Bradbury, Esther, the Beautiful Queen that inspired her to organize, direct, and star in a production of the piece in Washington, D.C. The performance, at Thanksgiving, 1881, was hailed as "a grand success," for it proved that "there is talent which needs but to be intelligently and thoroughly trained to produce really artistic performances."

== Move to Alabama and journalism ==
In early 1886, Tilghman sustained a skull fracture after she was hit by a falling brick at a construction site. The injury ended her musical career Tilghman relocated to Montgomery, Alabama, where she took a job in the public schools. When she arrived, reflected a journalist, looking back from 1893, "there were no colored pianists in Montgomery, and in no house where colored people lived did one hear in passing the artistic rendition of music as is now heard in almost every two or three squares." During her first year in town, Amelia organized a recital of her students in a local Congregational Church.

In Montgomery, Tilghman founded the first African-American music journal, a monthly publication called The Musical Messenger. This entrée into journalism was not easy for her, as men dominated the field at the time and for years after women reported facing prejudice. The journal's tagline was "the highest moral, social and intellectual interest of the people." The two surviving issues of the publication, both from 1889, focus on educating its readers about music history (such as the biography of Haydn), church choir repertoire, and sharing and circulating the names and work of African American composers. "That the race stands sadly in need of such a journal should be freely admitted. It is our earnest hope that the educator's hands may be strengthened and her soul fortified in this very creditable venture," wrote the Philadelphia Tribune.

In 1888, Tilghman returned permanently to Washington, D.C., to assist with the care of her mother, who was seriously ill. There, she hired the musician and teacher Lucinda B. Bragg Adams as an associate editor for The Musical Messenger. While widely celebrated, the publication was not profitable.

Tilghman discontinued the publication and refocused her energies on teaching after 1891. She died on December 12, 1931, in District of Columbia.
