= Daimler Manufacturing Company =

Defunct American motor vehicle manufacturer

The Daimler Manufacturing Company (DMFG), was a boutique American automaker company from 1898 to 1907. From 1888 to 1898, the company was known as the Daimler Motor Company (DMC), formed under a partnership between Gottlieb Daimler of Daimler-Motoren-Gesellschaft (DMG; predecessor to Mercedes-Benz) and William Steinway of piano manufacturer Steinway & Sons. Headquartered in Long Island City, Queens, New York City near Steinway's Astoria headquarters, the company sold Daimler motors for yachts and launches, and goods vehicles including buses and trucks. It built and sold a single automobile model, the original American Mercedes.

== History ==
In 1885, Gottlieb Daimler and business partner Wilhelm Maybach developed one of the first gasoline-powered engines, known as "the grandfather clock engine". At some point in 1888, Daimler met piano maker William Steinway, son of Steinway & Sons founder Henry E. Steinway and a former associate of Maybach. Some sources state that Daimler visited New York as a member of a male voice choir and by chance met William Steinway. Most others state that Steinway met Daimler on a visit to Germany. Nonetheless, as a result of the meeting the two businessmen founded Daimler Motor Company in Long Island City, New York near Steinway's headquarters in Astoria, opening on September 29, 1888. The company was officially incorporated on January 26, 1889. The company initially sold imported Cannstatt engines built in Germany. In 1891, DMC contracted National Machine Company of Hartford, Connecticut, to build engines to Daimler specifications. USA-Daimler started making their own automobile and stationary engines in 1895 followed a decade later under new ownership by perhaps one complete automobile.

Steinway confidently explained in an 1895 interview: "The fuel, petroleum, costs about one cent per hp and hour, making the automobile considerably less expensive than horse power. We already had a horseless vehicle here in 1893 but it was too lightly built for the rough cobblestone streets we have in this country”.

=== Change of ownership ===
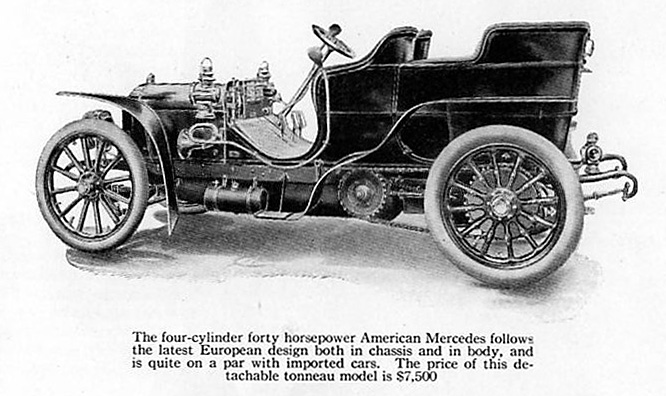
The car is steered from the right hand side.

Following Steinway's early death in 1896, his heirs weren't confident in the viability of the automobile project, and sold all their shares to the General Electric Company in 1898. On August 2, 1898, the company was reorganized as Daimler Manufacturing Company (DMFG), with Daimler-Motoren-Gesellschaft (DMG) the primary owner. The new company produced light trucks and buses under Daimler and Panhard et Levassor (another Daimler-contracted company) specifications. It also imported vehicles built in Europe by Daimler, Mercedes, and Panhard.

In 1904, the company discontinued its boat building operations in order to focus on automobiles. That year DMFG constructed its first car, called the "American Mercedes". The car was based on the European Mercedes 40-45 hp, featuring a top speed of 50 mph (80 km/h), a 4-cylinder engine of 6.8 liters displacement and four-speed transmission. On January 17, 1905, the locally constructed car was shown at the New York International Auto Show.

In the same month H. L. Bowden, Boston based owner of a steam yacht, established a speed record of 110 mph (175 km/h) average over a mile with flying start, in a car with a double Mercedes 60 hp engine at Daytona Beach, Florida.

The brand stood out in the automobile market with Mercedes advertising stating: "If you want the best, of course you want a foreign car... Mercedes is the car for speed, power and noiseless running. It is the acme of reliability.”

The first DMFG unit was sold in 1906, painted red.

=== Decline ===
On February 14, 1907, the DMFG factory was destroyed in a fire. The fire destroyed eight completed Mercedes, plus 40 others under construction, as well as drawings and machinery. One of these vehicles belonged to Standard Oil co-founder William Rockefeller. The fire also destroyed several nearby residences, rendering 100 local residents homeless. The rapid spread of the fire was attributed to the wooden construction of the Daimler facilities and much of the Steinway/Astoria neighborhood. Initially planning to rebuild, the company did not reconstruct the factory due to the financial panic of 1907 and the emergence of the American automotive industry. The company folded in 1913.

== Factory ==
The company was located at 939 to 967 Steinway Avenue, on the south side of 20th Avenue between Steinway Street (then-Steinway Avenue) to the east and 38th Street (Kouwenhoven Street) to the west in Steinway section of Astoria, Queens. The factory was located across from the trolley depot of the Steinway Street Line trolley line operated by the Steinway Railway. It was just south of Steinway & Sons' main piano factory and the Steinway Mansion, both located at the north end of Astoria along Bowery Bay.

The site consisted of several one-to-three buildings, all constructed of wood. The original building on the site measured 25 by 100 feet. A larger factory was constructed in 1895 when the company began building its own motors, and was expanded in 1899 to facilitate the construction of carriage and automobile bodies. This wooden-frame building occupied a 100 by 150 foot area of space facing Steinway Street, and stood two stories high, with a brick exterior and basement. Buildings on the west end of the block facing 38th Street were used for the storage of completed or partially completed vehicles.

A second facility, the "Daimler Motor Company Boat Houses", was located at the north end of 36th Street (then-Blackwell Street) along the Bowery Bay coast.

== See also ==
- Daimler
- Daimler Motoren Gesellschaft
- Austro Daimler
- Panhard, a French company also contracted by Daimler in the 1880s.
