= La Guardia and Wagner Archives =

- 40°44′39.1″N 73°56′15.7″W
- Location: Fiorello H. LaGuardia Community College/CUNY; 31-10 Thomson Avenue; Room E-238; Long Island City, NY 11101, United States
- Type: Archive
- Scope: New York City
- Established: 1982; 44 years ago

Other information
- Website: www.laguardiawagnerarchive.lagcc.cuny.edu

The La Guardia and Wagner Archives was established in 1982 at LaGuardia Community College in Long Island City, Queens, New York, to collect, preserve, and make available primary materials documenting the social and political history of New York City, with an emphasis on the mayoralty and the borough of Queens. The purpose of its founding went beyond serving as a repository, but to establish the college as a location for scholarly research. The archives serves a broad array of researchers, journalists, students, scholars, exhibit planners, and policy makers. Its web site provides guidelines to the collections, as well as over 55,000 digitized photographs and close to 2,000,000 digitized documents.

== Collections ==
This growing repository contains the papers of several mayors, the records of the New York City Council, the New York City Housing Authority, the piano maker Steinway & Sons, and a Queens History Collection. Many of the documents and photographs are available on their website.

=== Abraham D. Beame ===
Abraham Beame was Mayor of New York from 1974 to 1977. The Beame Collection consists of 1,800 photographs, more than 100 artifacts, and an assortment of papers documenting key themes of the Beame years. These include the fiscal crisis of the 1970s and the United States Bicentennial. The Beame oral history project has gathered unique recollections of more than 30 associates and contemporaries of the mayor.

=== David N. Dinkins ===
David N. Dinkins was the first African-American mayor of New York City, he was elected in a time of racial tension, high crime rates and economic uncertainty, serving from 1990 to 1993. Running for mayor he managed to defeat Edward I. Koch and Rudolph W. Giuliani, the mayors who are also present in the collections. The collection spans the years 1948-2000 and consists of 55,311 folders across 150 document series. The archives holds the full content of 34 series, representing about 25% of the collection, on microfilm. These include substantial number of subject level series, several important correspondence series and the press office/speeches series. The original documents are housed at the Municipal Archives of the New York City Department of Records and Information Service. The remaining record Series within the Dinkins Mayoral Collection were not microfilmed and are available only at the NYC Municipal Archives in their original print form.

=== Edward I. Koch ===
The archives is acquiring the personal papers of Edward I. Koch, New York's dynamic 105th mayor served three terms, 1978–89. This collection of predominantly post-mayoral materials includes 2,300 photographs, videos, and a variety of documents. Included in the collection are materials donated by contemporaries and associates of the mayor, facilitating research on such issues as charter revision and economic development. A portion of Mayor Koch's mayoral speeches, which is contained within the Koch Collection at La Guardia, is now available online in electronic full-text form. These speeches deal with some of the defining issues of the 1980s. Dozens of oral history transcripts offer insights into major public issues of the Koch years. A microfilm copy of the Koch Departmental Correspondence, held by the Municipal Archives, is available as well. The archives has produced several compilations of Mayor Koch's documents surrounding AIDS and the fiscal crisis. The Archives also recently completed a booklet of photographs and oral histories of former Mayor Koch, with every U.S. president from Reagan through Obama. This is part of an ongoing project to document former Mayor Koch's remembrances using his favorite photographs.

=== Fiorello H. La Guardia ===
As mayor during the turbulent period from 1934 to 1945, Fiorello H. La Guardia initiated major reforms during the Great Depression and World War II. In 1982, the mayor's widow, the late Marie La Guardia, donated her husband's personal papers to LaGuardia Community College. These documents, photographs, and personal artifacts chronicle Mayor La Guardia's life and times, providing an invaluable record of New York City history.

The collection contains transcripts of La Guardia's speeches, personal correspondence, and more than 3,000 photographs. It also has original sketches, scrapbooks, and records of his tenure as director general of the United Nations Relief and Rehabilitation Administration after World War II. The archives holds a microfilm copy of selected series of La Guardia's mayoral papers housed at the New York City municipal archive. This includes the mayor's scrapbooks, which record the media's reaction to La Guardia and the issues of the time. Selected documents are available online on the Archives' website in full-text digital form, including letters from Mayor LaGuardia to his sister Gemma, who sought her brother's help in returning to the United States after surviving a Nazi forced labor camp. After his last term, LaGuardia traveled across war-torn Europe and China to deliver aid to starving children as Director General of the United Nations Relief and Rehabilitation Administration (UNRRA). The thank you letters he received from children in Italy are featured. Also available electronically are the text of his Sunday radio broadcasts over WNYC from 1942 through 1945. The archives has available a microfilm copy of La Guardia's congressional papers, which are housed at the New York Public Library. The collection contains more than 100 hours of audio and video tapes of and about La Guardia, including oral history interviews with the mayor's friends and associates, radio broadcasts and newsreel footage.

=== John V. Lindsay ===
John V. Lindsay served as mayor from 1966 to 1973, a tumultuous time in New York history, characterized by racial and labor unrest, angry political protest, a police corruption scandal and deteriorating municipal finances. Lindsay built his political reputation as a maverick Liberal Republican Congressman from Manhattan's Silk Stocking district between 1959 and 1965. He brought a Kennedy-like glamour and excitement to Gracie Mansion. The Lindsay Collection spans the years 1962-1973 and consists of 4,575 folders, 182 photographs,2 videos and a two-volume scrapbook. The four document series consist of: Departmental Correspondence; General Correspondence; Subject Files; Confidential Subject Files. The records include correspondence, reports, transcriptions of speeches, and other public records, along with campaign documents and other materials related to his mayoralty. The original documents of all but the scrapbook series are housed at the Municipal Archives of the New York City Department of Records and Information Service.

=== Queens history ===
The archives houses a collection on the social history of Queens from the late 19th century to the late 20th century. This includes a 2,000-image photo collection. It contains views of transportation, leisure, work, and family life in New York's largest borough. The history of Astoria, Long Island City, and Woodside are especially well documented in this collection. The images show the transformation from a rural county in the late 19th century to an urban borough by 1950. The collection also has more than 90 oral histories on everyday life in Queens. An additional aspect is the papers of two settlement houses, Forest Hills Community House and Sunnyside Community Services. These collections shed light on a variety of important themes in the social history of post–World War II Queens, including race relations, demographic changes and transportation.

In the future, the archives will continue to strengthen its resources as a center for the study of modern New York City. In addition, the archives is working to acquire microfilm copies of the papers of all the 20th-century mayors.

=== Real Estate Board of New York (REBNY) ===
The Papers of Real Estate Board of New York, donated to the Archives by the Board in 2017, document the history of private real estate in New York City from the Board's founding, in 1896, to 2018. The largest portion of the Collection consists of the “Property Cards” (~200,000), produced by Real Estate Board of New York, which chronicle the real estate history of Manhattan properties. The other documents (~ 24cf) are divided between those published by REBNY (Manual and Diaries, REBNY Minutes, “Roll Call” Board of Governors, The Reporter, Open Market Sales Volumes, Reviews of Tax Assessments, Annual Journals, Annual Reports, and an Annual Banquet publication), and Non-REBNY publications (News-clippings, Manhattan Land Book, Owners of Real Estate in 1915, Manhattan Daily Transfer Reports, and Brooklyn Street Maps). There is also Subject Files Series, which includes office occupancy surveys, and there are several folders of REBNY President Steven Spinola's correspondence. The Collection also contains 38 Videos(including mostly copies of the “Realty Views” T.V. Program), 24 audio cassettes, about 3 cf of photos (mainly of the REBNY Annual Banquet), 25 artifacts (including the ceremonial trowel used for the groundbreaking of REBNY's 10-14 East 41st Street building in 1925), and 20 real estate handbooks/guides.

=== Robert F. Wagner ===
Mayor Robert F. Wagner Jr. was the second generation of the Wagner family to devote himself to public service. His father was U.S. Senator Robert F. Wagner, a major figure on the national scene in the New Deal era who sponsored landmark labor, civil rights, health, social security, and social welfare legislation. The mayor's son, Robert F. Wagner Jr. (deputy mayor), served as a member of the New York City Council, chair of the New York City Planning Commission, deputy mayor for policy, and president of the New York City Board of Education.

Mayor Robert F. Wagner served as chief executive of New York City for three terms. From 1954 to 1965, he oversaw the construction of housing, parks, roadways, and schools. He championed the growth and empowerment of municipal labor unions, and sponsored the creation of The City University of New York. He mobilized resources for the War on Poverty and ventured into new fields in income redistribution for the benefit of lower income groups and individuals. He used city government to combat housing bias and job discrimination.

All of these activities, programs, and concepts are reflected in the Wagner Collection, which consists of correspondence, transcripts of 3,000 speeches, over 7,000 photographs, personal artifacts, and a 100-interview oral history collection. Also available in electronic full-text form are the papers of Julius Edelstein, Wagner's executive assistant and closest advisor. Edelstein was a major figure in the redevelopment of the Upper West Side–-once described as "the most comprehensive urban renewal project in the U.S."—and a driving force in urban housing throughout the city. Also available in electronic form is the Judah Gribetz donation, a comprehensive file of newspaper clippings, journal articles, reports by city agencies and market surveys of city businesses organized by neighborhood, providing an invaluable guide to the boroughs in New York, neighborhood by neighborhood, for the 20th century. Judah Gribetz was Commissioner of Housing under Wagner. In addition, portions of Senator Robert F. Wagner's papers, held by Georgetown University, are available on microfilm. In 1994, the archives received the personal papers of Robert F. Wagner Jr., documenting the third and final generation of the Wagner family to serve in a public role.

=== Rudolph W. Giuliani ===
Rudolph Giuliani served as mayor from 1994 to 2001. Giuliani ran for mayor twice against David Dinkins in 1989 and again in 1993, losing the first election and winning the second, both in close races. Giuliani won his second term more easily against Manhattan Borough President Ruth Messinger in 1997. A strong and often divisive figure, Giuliani has been widely credited with reducing crime, cutting welfare rolls and restoring business confidence in the city, though his role in bringing about these changes was controversial. Giuliani established his law and order credentials in the Justice Department during the Reagan Administration, first as Associate Attorney General in Washington and then as the U.S. Attorney for the Southern District, New York. In this capacity he prosecuted high-profile insider trading cases on Wall Street and masterminded the fabled “Commission” case against New York's mafia leaders. The Giuliani Collection spans the years 1947-2001 and contains over 40,000index records across fifty series. The record series include departmental correspondence, general correspondence, subject files, schedules, as well as materials from the deputy mayors’ offices, assistant counsels’ offices, audio/video, and ephemera. A portion of the documents within this Collection are available in electronic form, and the remainder in their original print form only at the Municipal Archives of the New York City Department of Records and Information Services. The electronic documents have not been posted online, as some of them may present privacy issues. Most 2001 records are not available, because at the time of processing the Giuliani Papers, these files remained with the Mayor Bloomberg Administration.

=== Steinway & Sons ===
Henry Z. Steinway donated the papers of the Steinway & Sons piano company to the archives in 1985. The Steinway company figures prominently in American immigration, business, cultural, urban, and labor history. The Steinways first made pianos in Germany. Migrating to America, the family founded a piano company in Manhattan in 1853. The Steinway pianos has an international reputation for technical innovation and musical quality. In 1870, Steinway built a factory in Queens and constructed street railways and housing, contributing to the county's growth and development. The Steinway & Sons Collection consists of family, business, and workers' records from 1853 to 2007. The collection also contains nearly 4,000 photographs, including several signed prints by the famed photographer Margaret Bourke-White, and more than 50 hours of audio and videotapes. In 1995, the archives acquired a restored 1858 Steinway square piano, which is now part of the collection.

=== The Council of the City of New York ===
This collection of the New York City Council represents an unparalleled snapshot of the legislative history of America's biggest city from the 1930s and into the 21st century. It includes not only copies of the thousands of enacted laws and official publications, but also the records of public hearings and committee files on legislation under consideration and ad hoc investigations, numerous photographs and negatives, maps, artifacts, scrapbooks, audio and videotapes, as well as the papers of dozens of individual council members, including former leaders Newbold Morris, Joseph Sharkey, Paul Screvane, and Peter Vallone. Three one-time council members rose to the mayoralty of New York City: Fiorello La Guardia, Vincent Impellitteri, and Edward Koch. This collection gives a vivid picture of day-to-day life in the city, focusing on constituency issues close to ordinary people such as housing, drugs, crime, welfare, community development, health, and the environment. It also provides historians with a wider understanding of a local government that is frequently overshadowed in the media by the prominence of a powerful mayor. Legislative documents from 1955 to 1997 are searchable on the website. Over 500,000 of these are now available online in full-text form. The website also contains more than 13,000 searchable photographs.

=== The LGBTQ Collection ===
Presently, the bulk of the LGBTQ collection comes from the Daniel Dromm papers and NYS Senator/Assemblyman Tom Duane. Daniel Dromm, a Queens public school teacher from 1984 to 2009, was a founder of the Queens Lesbian and Gay Pride Committee and an organizer of the Queens Pride Parade and Festival, inaugurated in Jackson Heights in 1993. The Daniel Dromm papers, consisting of 24 cubic ft. of documents and artifacts, are made up of the following Document Series: Pride; Subject Files, Scrapbooks, Magazines/Publications, Articles and Clippings, Political Campaigns, and Personal/Business Contacts/Appointment books. His papers serve to illuminate Queens LGBTQ history and activism from the 1990s to the early 2010s.The senator Thomas Duane LGBTQ Collection presently consists of two Series: the Gay Literature Series And the Personal Gay Files Series. The Gay Literature Series consists mainly of issues of the Christopher Magazine from 1976 to 1993. The Personal Gay Files Series contains documents collected by senator Duane, before, during and after his time in political office, related to LGBTQ issues.

=== The New York City Housing Authority (NYCHA) ===
The archives is the repository of the New York City Housing Authority (NYCHA). Founded in 1934, NYCHA was the first housing authority in the United States. The authority manages 336 projects housing more than 403,000 people. The collection covers the period from the late 1920s to the early 1990s. It documents the construction of New York's public housing projects and provides information about the lives of the residents. Most major themes in the social history of 20th century New York can be studied through the records. The collection contains correspondence, reports, news clippings, testimony, and surveys of neighborhoods and tenant populations. It also has more than 50,000 images, including photos of city neighborhoods before the projects were built. About 4,800 can be viewed on the archives' website. In addition, there is a special presentation on the archives' website, with commentary by historian Joel Schwartz. An oral history collection preserves the thoughts and comments of NYCHA staff members.

=== Vincent R. Impellitteri ===
Vincent R. Impellitteri was a mayor beset with political and practical challenges. Serving as the City Council President at the time of Mayor O’Dwyer’s resignation, Impellitteri succeeded to the mayoralty in August 1950. Despite strong opposition from Tammany Hall, he retained the office by winning a special election later that year. Dubbed “Impy” by the press, many considered him ineffectual and he was often outmaneuvered by both Republican Governor Dewey and by the Democratic Tammany leader, Carmine DeSapio. Serving less than a full term, Impellitteri lost the mayoralty to Robert F. Wagner in the regular election in 1953. The Impellitteri Collection spans the years 1945-1953 and consists of 2,870 folders across three series: Departmental Correspondence; General Correspondence; and Subject Files. Most of the collection covers the governmental records of Impellitteri's mayoralty (1950–1953). The records include correspondence, reports, transcriptions of speeches, and other public records, along with campaign documents and other materials related to his mayoralty. The original documents are housed at the Municipal Archives of the New York City Department of Records and Information Services. The LaGuardia and Wagner Archives holds these series on microfilm.

=== William O'Dwyer ===
William O’Dwyer was a popular and celebrated mayor during what some have called the golden age of New York City. However, investigations into organized crime and police corruption in the years during and following his mayoralty tarnished his reputation. Backed by Tammany Hall in 1941, O’Dwyer narrowly lost to incumbent Fiorello LaGuardia, but ran again in 1945 to become the city's 100th mayor. The O’Dwyer Collection spans the years 1936-1952 and consists of 6,151 folders across three series: Departmental Correspondence; General Correspondence; and Subject Files. Most of the collection covers the governmental records of O’Dwyer's mayoralty (1946–1950). The records include correspondence, reports, transcriptions of speeches, and other public records, along with campaign documents and other materials related to his mayoralty. The original documents are housed at the Municipal Archives of the New York City Department of Records and Information Services. The LaGuardia and Wagner Archives holds these series on microfilm.

== Education projects ==
The archive has developed a six-lesson curriculum for local 4th-grade students, aimed at teaching the importance of voting and the history of suffrage. It has also developed the "City of Immigrants" history curriculum, aimed at teaching racial diversity in local schools.
