= Lucinda Bragg Adams =

American physician, educator, temperance leader, musician and writer

Lucie Bragg Anthony
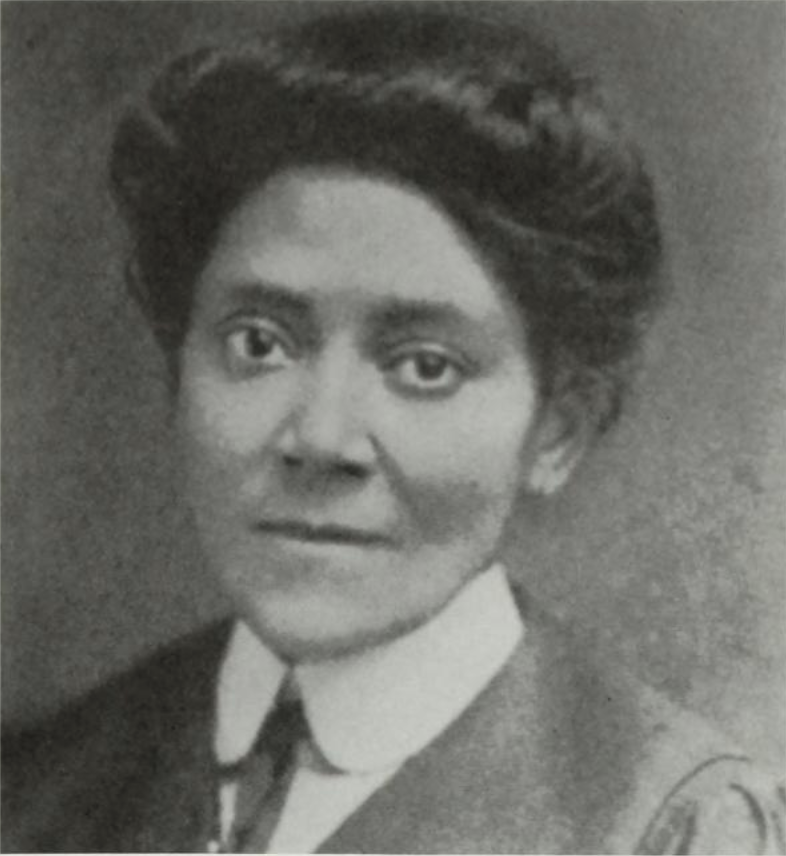
- Born: Lucinda Bragg; December 4, 1860; Warrenton, North Carolina
- Died: August 22, 1932 (aged 71); Baltimore, Maryland
- Resting place: Mount Auburn Cemetery
- Education: Oberlin Conservatory of Music (1893); Meharry Medical College (1907)
- Occupations: Physician, educator, temperance leader, musician, writer
- Employer(s): Sumter County Colored Schools (supervisor); The Musical Messenger (associate editor)
- Notable work: Little Clusters: a Mixed Method for Beginners (1925)
- Spouses: Edward Peters (m. ca. 1879-1883); John Wesley Adams (m. 1887-1893; dissolved); Francis W. Anthony (m. 1908) (his death)
- Relatives: George Freeman Bragg (brother)

Lucinda "Lucie" Bragg Adams (née Bragg; other surnames include Peters and Anthony; December 4, 1860 — August 22, 1932) was an African American physician, educator, temperance leader, musician, and writer.

== Early life and education ==
Lucinda Bragg was born in Warrenton, North Carolina, the daughter of George Freeman Bragg and his wife, Mary Bragg.

She moved shortly afterward to Petersburg, Virginia, where her family had roots. Her grandmother had founded Petersburg's St. Stephen's Episcopal Church. Her older brother was George Freeman Bragg, publisher of the Afro-American Churchman and the Church Advocate.

Adams' family were close friends of John Mercer Langston, the first African-American Congressman, and Adams later dedicated her song Old Blandford Church to him.

From ages 6 to 13, she was taken by a white missionary to Salem, New Jersey to attend a white school and receive a musical education (as there were yet no schools established for Blacks in Petersburg).

She attended the Colored Schools of Petersburg. She graduated from Oberlin Conservatory of Music in 1893, and received an M.D. degree from Meharry Medical College in 1907.

== Career ==
Adams was noted for her musical talent at a young age. She performed in the Petersburg region as a solo and ensemble singer (sometimes with the Selika Quartette), and as an organist, pianist, violinist, and guitarist. Her musical compositions were circulated widely in Virginia.

By 1877, she taught at the Normal School associated with Petersburg's St. Stephen's Episcopal Church. During this time she was a member of the musical board of Petersburg's Chorannesse Literary and Social Club. Her first husband Edward Peters was treasurer of a similar Petersburg club, the Aeolian Club. Lucinda left Petersburg in order to find opportunities to teach music (Petersburg's public school system didn't hire black teachers). By 1882 she was teaching in Danville, and in 1883 she became principal of the "colored school" in Harrisonburg.

In 1887, she taught in Charlotte, North Carolina at St. Michael's Training and Industrial School.

In 1885, she had composed a waltz, a march dedicated to J. E. O'Hara, several sacred pieces, and the song Old Blandford Church. The latter is based on a poem found on the walls of the ancient church in Petersburg (written by a Eliza Hening of Petersburg, but often wrongly attributed to Tyrone Power), and is the 2nd composition known to have been published by an African American woman (after Louise Smith's Forgive).

She had become an accomplished journalist and editor, publishing, editing, and contributing to publications including the A.M.E. Church Review, Our Women and Children, the Petersburg Lancet, Afro-American Churchman, and the Church Advocate (many of these with her sister Carrie and her brother George). In 1892, when Amelia Tilghman revived her pioneering music journal The Musical Messenger in Washington DC, she chose Adams (then living in Baltimore) as her associate editor. Adams corresponded about musical life in Baltimore, and brought her experience and professional network to the paper. She secured the writing talents of Victoria Earle (whom she knew from the A.M.E. Church Review) to write for the paper.

After receiving her medical degree in 1907 and marrying A.M.E. minister F.W. Anthony in 1908, Adams moved on to a career away from music, journalism, or medicine and into education. Likely pursuant to F.W. Anthony's church assignments, the couple lived in Henderson, Kentucky where she was principal of Saint Clemens School, and San Antonio, Texas, where she was the principal of a church school. She taught kindergarten at the John Hopkins Home for Colored Children in Charlotte, North Carolina, and established the Industrial Department at Clinton College in Rock Hill, South Carolina.

The pair settled in Sumter, South Carolina, where in 1915 she became the first supervisor of the Sumter County Colored Schools and worked there for 15 years. She fought for fundraising, capital improvements (42 buildings were constructed during her tenure), salary increases and increased teaching standards (lengthening the school term from 10 weeks to 22 weeks, and obtaining high school degrees for many of her students). In 1925, she wrote the elementary school reader Little Clusters for use in the district, which included original songs. In 1931, she chronicled her work in A Concise History of Sumter County Colored Schools 1915-1931. She was part of the executive committee of the National Association of Teachers in Colored Schools.

Lucinda died in Baltimore, Maryland in 1932. Some of her archives are held by the Sumter Historical Society. In 1993 she was one of 20 women honored (along with Mary Bethune) by Volunteer Sumter as an inaugural member of the Women's Honor Roll of Sumter County.

The Bragg family were the inspiration for Emory Waters' 2000 opera, The Edge of Glory, which was premiered in a concert staging by the Petersburg Symphony Orchestra.

== Marriages ==
- Edward Peters, ? - ~1883
- John Wesley Adams, from October 15, 1887 to 1893 (separated in 1889)
- Francis W. Anthony, an A.M.E. Zion minister, from 1908 to his death in 1928.
