= American Mercedes (1904 automobile) =

Defunct American motor vehicle manufacturer

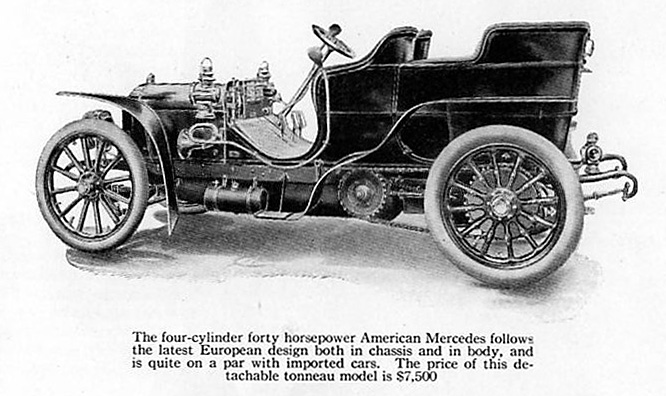
The original "American Mercedes".

The American Mercedes was made by Daimler Manufacturing Company of Long Island City, New York, United States from 1904 to 1907. They were licensed copies of German Mercedes models. Some commercial vehicles, such as ambulances, were also made. The company was in direct competition with Mercedes Import Co. of New York, which handled the imported Mercedes for the entirety of the United States, at least in 1906.
