= Steinway Mansion =

Historic house in Queens, New York

- U.S. National Register of Historic Places
- New York City Landmark
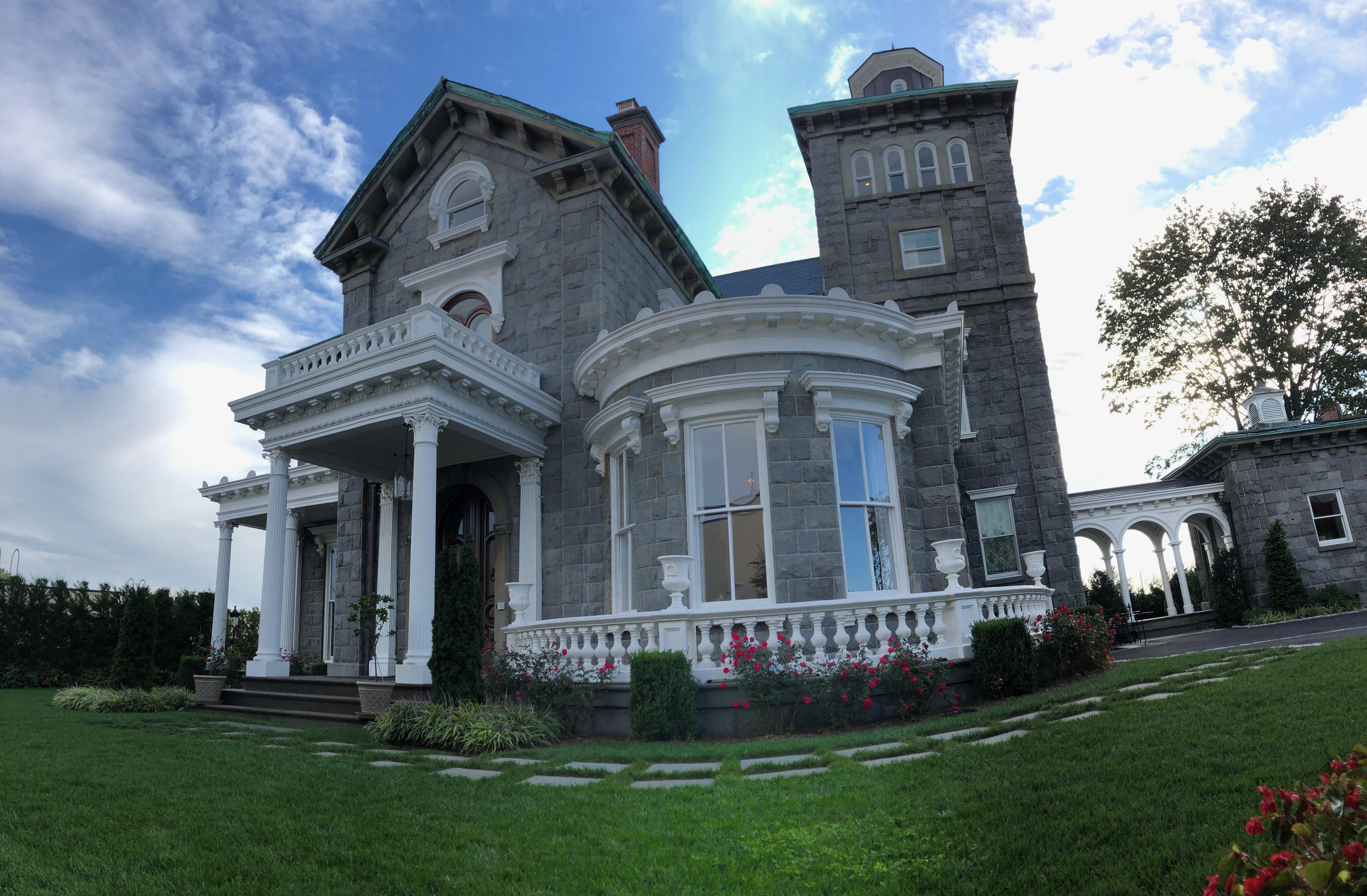
- Steinway Mansion in 2019
- Location: 18-33 41st Street, Astoria, Queens, New York 11105
- Coordinates: 40°46′43.5″N 73°53′49.5″W
- Area: 0.28 acres (1,100 m^{2})
- Built: 1858; 168 years ago
- Built by: Benjamin Pike Jr.
- Architectural style: Italianate; Renaissance Revival
- NRHP reference No.: 83001780
- NYCL No.: 0632

Significant dates
- Added to NRHP: September 8, 1983
- Designated NYCL: February 15, 1967

The Steinway Mansion (also known as the Benjamin Pike Jr. House) is a historic Italianate and Renaissance Revival villa located at 18-33 41st Street in the Astoria neighborhood of Queens, New York City. Constructed between 1857 and 1858 by Benjamin Pike Jr., a Manhattan-based scientific instrument maker, it originally sat on a 70-acre estate along the Long Island Sound. The mansion was purchased in 1870 by William Steinway of Steinway & Sons, who developed the surrounding area into Steinway Village, a planned industrial community. In 1926, the property was acquired by Jack Halberian, whose family would go on to own the home for over 80 years. It was designated a New York City Landmark in 1967 and added to the National Register of Historic Places in 1983. The mansion was sold in 2014 to new owners and underwent extensive restoration. It is reported to be one of the few remaining 19th-century villas in Queens.

== History ==
=== Construction and Pike ownership (1857–1870) ===
The mansion was constructed as a 27-room summer residence between 1857 and 1858 at a cost of $85,000, situated on a 70-acre property with 4,000 feet of waterfront along the Long Island Sound.

It was commissioned by Benjamin Pike Jr., a Manhattan-based manufacturer and dealer of optical and scientific instruments. The house served as a private retreat from the city. Pike included design elements that reflected his professional interests through interior features such as the cut glass in pocket doors depicting a number of his scientific instruments.

Pike died in 1864, and following his death, the estate passed into the hands of his widow.

=== Steinway ownership (1870–1926) ===
Following Pike's death, his widow sold the mansion to William Steinway of Steinway & Sons in 1870.

In response to the tenuous labor situation in Manhattan and the violent New York City draft riots that had previously threatened his factory, Steinway expanded his Queens property to 440 acres, upon which he would build the Steinway Piano Factory and what would become Steinway Village, a self-sufficient company town designed to support his business operations. By relocating to a less congested environment, he aimed to avoid the labor unrest and logistical challenges associated with operating in Manhattan. Steinway Village included housing for its workers, a church, a library, a kindergarten, and numerous amenities, ensuring a stable community for employees and their families. Additionally, a public trolley line was constructed to connect the area to the rest of Queens.

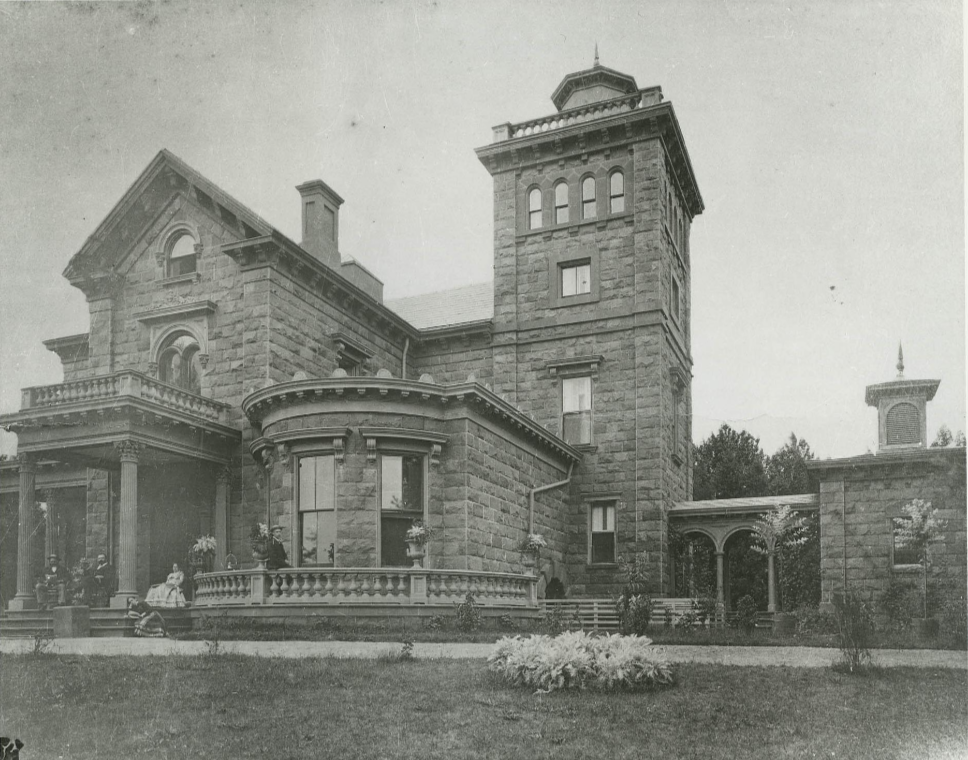
Steinway Mansion in 1881

The eastern portions of the property were developed into North Beach Amusement Park at Bowery Bay Beach. This area would later undergo significant transformation to become North Beach Airport in 1929, later renamed LaGuardia Airport.

It has been alleged that President Grover Cleveland visited and slept at the mansion in the 1880s as a guest of Henry E. Steinway; however, no verifiable accounts have ever been found.

=== Halberian ownership (1926–2010) ===
==== Jack Halberian (1926–1976) ====
Jack Halberian, an Armenian-Turkish immigrant who had arrived in the United States in 1913, first encountered the Steinway Mansion while riding a trolley through Astoria toward North Beach Amusement Park in 1914. Reportedly impressed by the grandeur of the house, he vowed that one day he would own it and after saving enough money through his tailoring business during World War I, he purchased the mansion in 1926, shortly after it was put up for sale by the Steinway family. However, due to its remote location, the mansion's electricity and running water had been supplied from the nearby Steinway factory, and hence, once the Steinways left, said services were discontinued. This disruption forced Halberian to undertake major upgrades and renovations. He installed new water lines and persuaded Con Edison to construct power lines that would connect the mansion to the larger grid. However, as a result of the high costs, he nearly went bankrupt and was forced to take out a demand mortgage in 1928 that nearly cost him the house.

During the Great Depression, Halberian was offered $75,000 for the house by a Greek primate named Athenagoras, who wanted to convert it into an orphanage that would work in tandem with the recently opened Saint Demetrios Cathedral in Astoria. However, despite reported pleas from his friends and loved ones, he was uninfluenced by the money, citing his personal attachment to the property. In an effort to raise additional money to pay for the expenditures associated with maintenance, the mansion was converted into a four-family home. The Halberians lived in one section, while three other families rented out the others.

In 1947, the Modern Art Foundry moved its location a carriage house which used to serve the mansion.

In 1966, the New York City Landmarks Preservation Commission designated the mansion as a landmark, and it was added to the National Register of Historic Places in 1983.

==== Michael Halberian (1976–2010) ====
Upon Jack Halberian's death in 1976, his son Michael Halberian, who had grown up in the home, inherited the property and moved back in, beginning his own extensive restoration efforts. A complete renovation saw the addition of a motorized 1,000-pound chandelier (originally belonging to the Whitney family), a jacuzzi, a steam room, and a sauna. Later, he purchased and restored six mahogany booths at a price of $20,000, which were older than the mansion and were once part of an English pub. While visiting the mansion during his tenure as Mayor of New York City, Ed Koch offered Halberian compensation for the six booths so that he could have them moved to the recently renovated Gracie Mansion. However, Halberian declined the offer.

In later years, Halberian faced growing difficulty maintaining the mansion due to his advancing age, rising maintenance costs, and an annual property tax of approximately $20,000. In 1993, owner Michael Halberian attempted to sell the Steinway Mansion to the Greater Astoria Historical Society for $3 million. Despite Halberian’s efforts, the high price and the mansion's maintenance costs left the property unsold.

In 2006, a documentary titled The Steinway Mansion was produced, featuring extensive interviews with Michael Halberian and Henry Z. Steinway, as well as rare archival photographs.

In 2008, Michael Halberian listed the Steinway Mansion for sale at an asking price of $2.5 million, with an adjacent two-acre lot priced separately for an additional $2.5 million. In an effort to raise awareness and support for preservation, Halberian collaborated with New York City Councilmember Peter Vallone Jr. to organize a rare public tour of the mansion. Vallone advocated for the City of New York to purchase the mansion for use as a museum or educational center. Although multiple organizations, including the Greater Astoria Historical Society and the Historic House Trust, expressed support for preservation, no public acquisition was finalized.

In addition to his restoration work, Michael amassed an extensive collection of historical artifacts within the mansion. Among the items he preserved were 19th-century New York City corporation manuals, ancient cannons, early magic lantern projectors, hundreds of historical maps, and several scientific instruments originally manufactured by Benjamin Pike Jr. By the end of his life, he estimates he had spent $4-5 million upkeeping and preserving the house.

Despite its well-known association with the Steinway family, Henry Z. Steinway—the last family member to serve as president of Steinway & Sons—reportedly expressed that the "Steinway Mansion" name could be misleading, noting that "the Halberians owned the mansion longer than the Steinways did".

On December 27, 2010, Halberian died of chronic obstructive pulmonary disease following a severe snowstorm that left roads unplowed. Paramedics were delayed reaching the mansion, and when they finally arrived on foot, Halberian had collapsed near the gate. He was brought back into the mansion, where paramedics failed to resuscitate him, and he died in the front hall of the mansion.

=== Post-Halberian ===
The mansion was put up for sale after Michael's death in 2010, but the high price, protected status, and poor condition deterred potential buyers from buying the property. A diverse group of Astoria historians, elected officials, and business leaders formed The Friends of Steinway Mansion in an effort to purchase the mansion out of fears of future mishandling. They were then joined by The Artisans Guild of America, Steinway & Sons, and State Assemblywomen Marge Markey and Aravella Simotas. They were unsuccessful in their attempt to raise $5 million and acquire the house.

After years on the market, as well as numerous price reductions, Sal Lucchese and Philip Loria paid $2.65 million for the property in 2014. Parts of the surrounding land were then developed into commercial warehouses, leaving the mansion on just more than a quarter acre of property. By this time, the nearly 150-year-old mansion was in a state of significant deterioration, and hence, the new owners undertook an ambitious restoration project, which included reconstructing the grand balcony.

In 2022, the Steinway Mansion hosted the annual gala of the Variety Boys and Girls Club of Queens, a fundraising event attended by local public officials and community leaders.

== Description ==
=== Architectural features ===
The Steinway Mansion is a grand Italianate and Renaissance Revival villa-style dwelling, although its architect remains unknown. It is constructed of granite and bluestone with cast-iron ornamentation and has a two-story, T-shaped central section gable roof. Another prominent feature is the four-story tower crowned with an octagonal cupola that was previously surrounded by balustrades.

=== Interior details ===
It has a one-story library in a wing housing large bay windows that was once the study of both William Steinway and Michael Halberian. Other notable elements include three porches supported by cast iron Corinthian columns, five Italian marble fireplaces, and original pocket doors with cut glass depicting many of Benjamin Pike Jr.’s scientific instruments. The center main hall contains elaborately carved walnut balustrades, a two-story domed rotunda topped with a central stained glass skylight, and 12-foot (3.7 m) ceilings throughout. There are three large underground cisterns designed to collect rainwater from the roof for grounds irrigation and a 1,000-gallon (3,800 L) copper tank in the attic to furnish the house with a pressurized water system for bath and kitchen use.

== In popular culture ==
=== Films ===
- The Pursuit of Happiness (1971): The Steinway Mansion was used as the filming location for the grandmother's house. Three scenes feature extensive shots of both the interior and exterior of the mansion.

=== Television ===
- Evil (2019), Season 1, Episode 6 ("Let x = 9"): An interior scene was filmed at the Steinway Mansion.

== See also ==
- List of New York City Designated Landmarks in Queens
- National Register of Historic Places listings in Queens
- Modern Art Foundry
- Benjamin Pike Jr.
- William Steinway
