= Bishop Payne Divinity School =

Former school for African-Americans in Petersburg, Virginia

Coordinates: 37.21936599809°N 77.4183788857°W

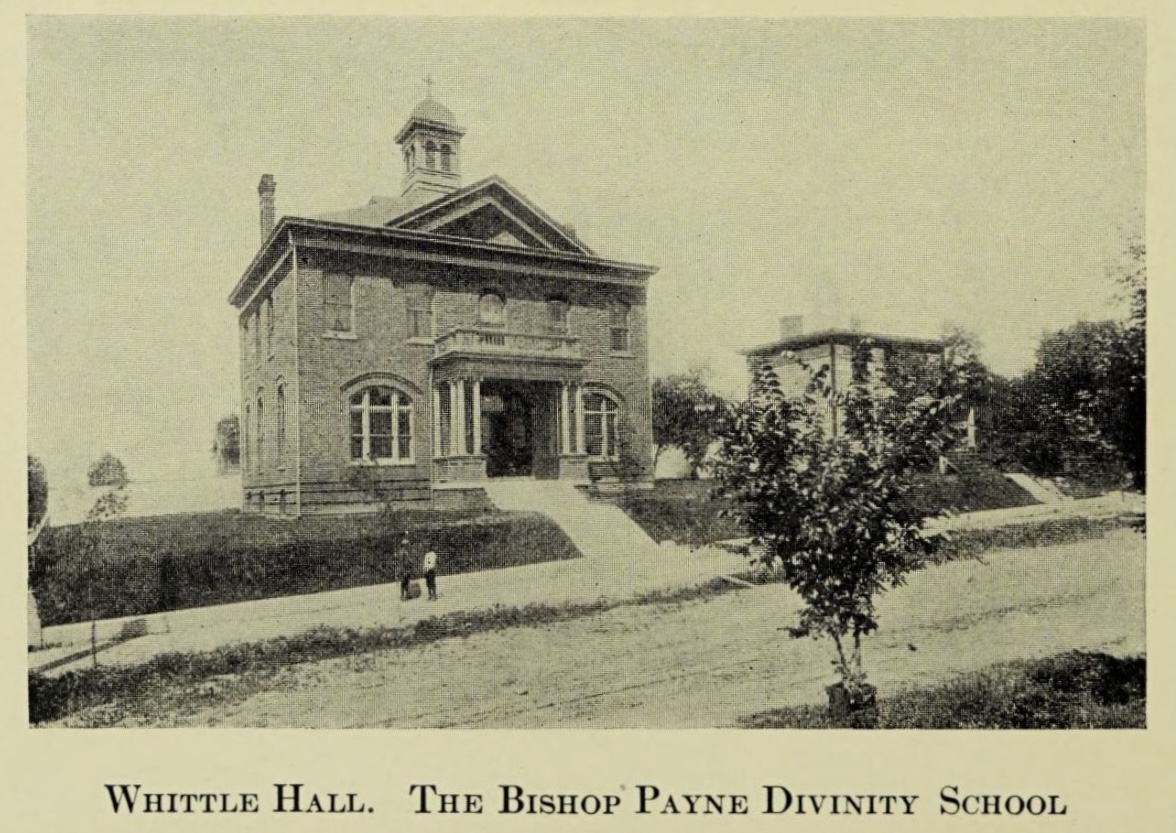
Whittle Hall, the Bishop Payne Divinity School.

Bishop Payne Divinity School was a former Episcopal school for African-American ministerial students, in Petersburg, Virginia. It operated on Perry Street (1878–1886), West Washington Street (1886–1889), and South West Street (1889–1949). The school's Emmanuel Chapel still stands, at the corner of South West and Willcox Streets. The school was closed in 1953.

== History ==
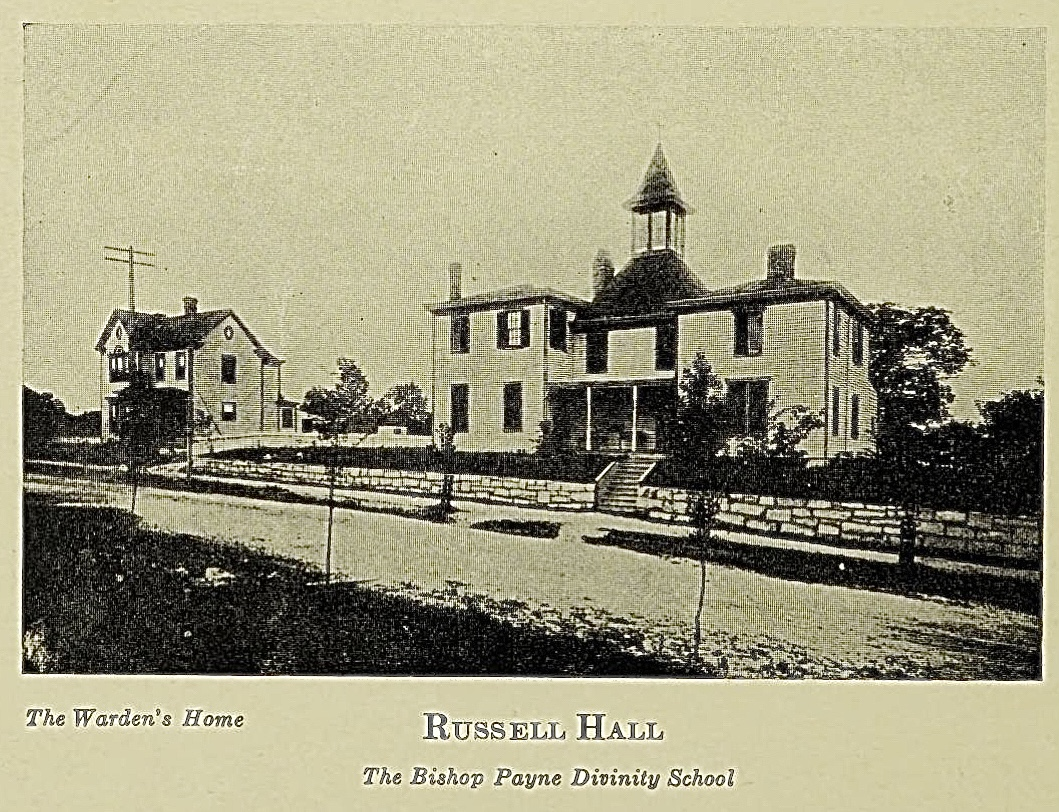
Russell Hall and the Warden's home, across the street from Whittle Hall.

The college was established in 1878 when James Solomon Russell was called to the ministry but was not allowed to study at the all-white Episcopal Virginia Theological Seminary in Alexandria, Virginia. To provide schooling for him, and other African-American students who "were not in any way prepared to enter either the Preparatory Department or the Theological Department of the Seminary", some of whom "had only the barest rudiments of common-school [primary school] education," a theology professor was added to a new school in Petersburg, Virginia for freedmen, St. Stephen's Normal and Industrial School. The theology professor's salary ($600) was paid by Virginia Theological Seminary. The school was located on Perry Street, between Gill and Washington Streets. Russell was the only ministerial student for three years. By 1876, 20 students had enrolled.

It was chartered in 1884 by the state of Virginia as the Bishop Payne Divinity and Industrial School, in honor of John Payne, first Episcopal bishop of Liberia. Payne's widow was the school matron. "The title of the school was somewhat misleading as it implied an Industrial Department which the school did not have, and gave no hint of a Normal Department, which the school did have." The school did, however, provide high school level instruction, as did most normal schools at the time.

From 1886 to 1889, the school was based in a house and lot in the 1100 block of South Washington Street. In 1889, the school purchased eight lots on both sides of the street in the 400 block of South West Street, where it built Whittle Hall and Russell Hall on opposite sides of the street, remaining at that location until it closed. In 1902, the Warden's residence was erected and in 1917 Emmanuel Chapel was added. In 1910, the school gained the ability to award the Bachelor of Divinity degree and was renamed the Bishop Payne Divinity School.

The church's Diocese of Virginia decided to deny a vote in the Diocesan Council to all newly ordained black clergymen. Enrollment at Bishop Payne Divinity School was negatively affected, to the point of threatening the school's survival.

From 1905 to 1922 the president was Corbin Braxton Bryan, a white supremacist who believed whites had a responsibility to offer blacks the benefits of Christianity.

The last graduating class of the school was in 1949. Virginia Theological Seminary began admitting African-American students in 1951. At least 256 Black men and 6 Black women had attended (not all graduated).

On June 3, 1953, the school's assets and records were transferred to Virginia Theological Seminary. The merger was negotiated by civil rights attorney Armistead Boothe.

== Enrollment ==
Bishop Payne was the only Divinity School in the Episcopal Church devoted exclusively to the training of "young Negro men" for the ministry; as of 1921, there were 91 alumni, who constituted about 60% of the Episcopal Black clergy in the U.S. Enrollment was generally low, only about 12–15 at a time.

The school's faculty were predominately white. In 1894, John W. Johnson, an 1890 graduate, became the first Black faculty member. In 1921, there were five professors, four of them white; as of that there were 81 alumni. Until the 1940s all the trustees, photographed in an old film clip, were white; in 1947, seven of the seventeen trustees were Black.

== Legacy ==
The library at Virginia Theological Seminary is named the Bishop Payne Library.

== Notable alumni ==
- George Freeman Bragg
- James Solomon Russell
