= Benjamin Pike Jr. =

American optician and businessman (1809–1864)

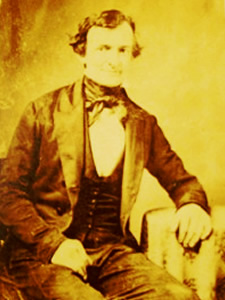
- Born: 1809; New York City, U.S.
- Died: May 7, 1864 (aged 53); Astoria, Queens, New York, U.S.
- Resting place: Green-Wood Cemetery
- Occupations: Optician; businessman
- Years active: 1831–1864
- Spouse: Frances Matilda Hope (m. 1838)
- Children: 3

Benjamin Pike Jr. (1809 – May 7, 1864) was a businessman and manufacturer of philosophical and optical instruments. He was the eldest son of Benjamin Pike Sr., whom he joined in business from 1831 to 1841 under the name Benjamin Pike & Son, before establishing his own successful firm, Benjamin Pike Jr. & Co.

== Early life ==
Benjamin Pike Jr. was born in 1809 in New York City, New York, into a family of English immigrants. His father, Benjamin Pike Sr., immigrated from the United Kingdom to establish his own optical, scientific, and engineering business in New York, Benjamin Pike Sr. Very little is known about Pike's early life, but it is known he grew up in the Pike family home on North Moore Street, Manhattan. It is presumed that he studied to be an optician like Pike Sr.

Pike had five siblings, Daniel, Mary, Elizabeth, Gardiner, and Harriet, all born between 1818 and 1827.

== Career ==
=== Benjamin Pike & Sons ===
Records show that in 1831, Pike Jr. joined his father in business, prompting the company to adopt the name Benjamin Pike & Son. However, this name would go on to change quite frequently as family members came and went from the business. For example, when Pike's younger brother, Daniel, joined the business in 1839, it became known as Benjamin Pike & Sons.

By the 1840s, the firm had reportedly earned widespread acclaim from patrons and experts alike, with Benjamin Pike & Sons going on to win a Silver Medal at the Fifth Annual Fair of the Mechanics' Institute, being commended for their "surveying and drawing instruments". The Thirteenth Annual Fair of the American Institute would mark another victory for the firm after receiving a second place Diploma for "specimens of surveyors compasses and levels, beautiful finish"

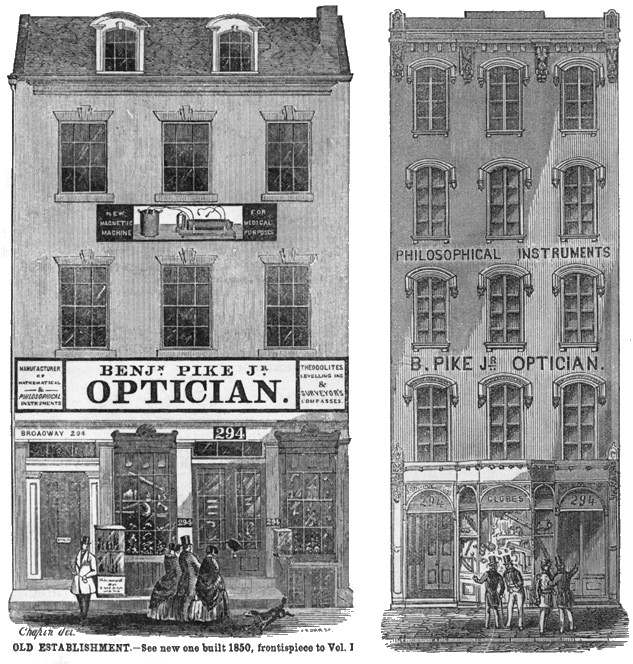
Two illustrations of the optical store owned and operated by Benjamin Pike Jr from 1848 (left) and 1856 (right), respectively.

=== Benjamin Pike Jr. & Co ===
In 1843, Benjamin Jr. separated from his family's business and formed his own firm, viewed in similarly high regard by, known simply as Benjamin Pike Jr. & Co., located at 294 Broadway. This location also served as his family's home until 1858. Pike Jr.’s previous experience and reported expertise earned his new venture recognition, with many noting his "widely known mechanical skill". His firm won several awards for both the quality and use of his many instruments, including three silver medals at American Institute Fairs shortly after going into business. Two of which were for his remarkably "superior air pumps" and one other for his innovative "electro-magnetic apparatus". It was again at the American Institute Fairs that he would win two diplomas that demonstrated his firm's proficiency in both purely mathematical and scientific instruments.

==== Scientific catalogs ====
Pike Jr.’s success was supported not only by craftsmanship but also by his approach to marketing. In the 1840s, he issued two catalogs, one in 1848 and another in 1856, that together listed over 750 instruments ranging from telescopes to spectacles. The catalogs included descriptions, engravings, and basic instructions for use, along with information on the scientific principles behind the devices. Rather than limiting sales to customers who visited his Manhattan firm, Pike created a system that allowed people from anywhere to view and purchase his products remotely and on a larger scale. This made the catalog not only a sales tool but also a valuable educational resource for scientists and engineers.

This marketing innovation was significant for his business and influenced the broader scientific community and the dissemination of scientific knowledge. It was regarded as one of the most comprehensive collections of philosophical instruments produced at the time, functioning as a wide-ranging catalog of scientific devices and products available during the period.

Moreover, it was in these catalogs that Pike took the opportunity to further emphasize the quality of his products and the innovative and modern nature of his designs that incorporated all the finest aspects of the age's contemporary science and engineering. He further wished to sway the favor of the United States' growing scientific community and shift their consumption from traditionally European instruments to those of his own firm, and in this goal, he largely succeeded. Hence, orders were received from all across the nation and even parts of Europe, which brought Pike and his company continued recognition and prestige. He then massively expanded his business by demolishing and rebuilding a larger version of his store at the same address in 1850 to accommodate the new influx of customers. Leading to the further growth and development of the market reach of his firm as word spread of its quality.

In addition, his depictions and descriptions were used commonly for more than a century for analysis of both period and contemporary counterparts of scientific instruments in a wide variety of textbooks. By the early 20th century, his work remained in use for scientific demonstration and description in both professional and scholastic environments.

== Personal life ==
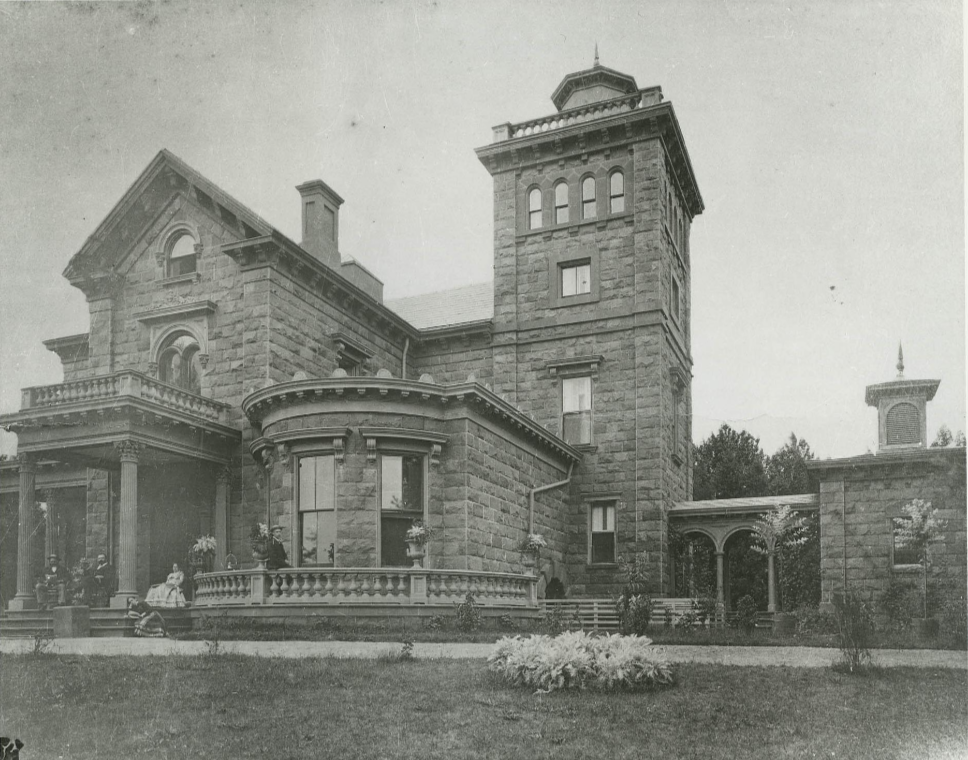
The Steinway Mansion in 1881

Pike married Frances Matilda Hope on April 14, 1838, with whom he had a son and two daughters.

The Pike family reportedly desired an escape from the more crowded life of the city where they had been living on the upper floors of their shop for over a decade. So, using the income collected from his firm, Pike constructed an $85,000 27-room mansion in Northern Queens in what is today Astoria, New York. He was seen here in the 1860 U.S. Census, and despite his optical firm, Pike had his occupation listed as a farmer.

== Death ==
Pike died of "congestion of the lungs" on the morning of May 7, 1864, in Astoria, New York, around the age of 53. He was then buried in buried in Green-Wood Cemetery. According to directories, the Pike Jr. firm was permanently closed shortly after.

The Pike home was later sold to William Steinway of the piano-making Steinway family in 1870 after the death of Pike Jr. by his widow, and is today known as the Steinway Mansion. It is unknown where Pike's widow and children moved following this.

== See also ==
- Steinway Mansion
