= Mia LaBerge =

American artist

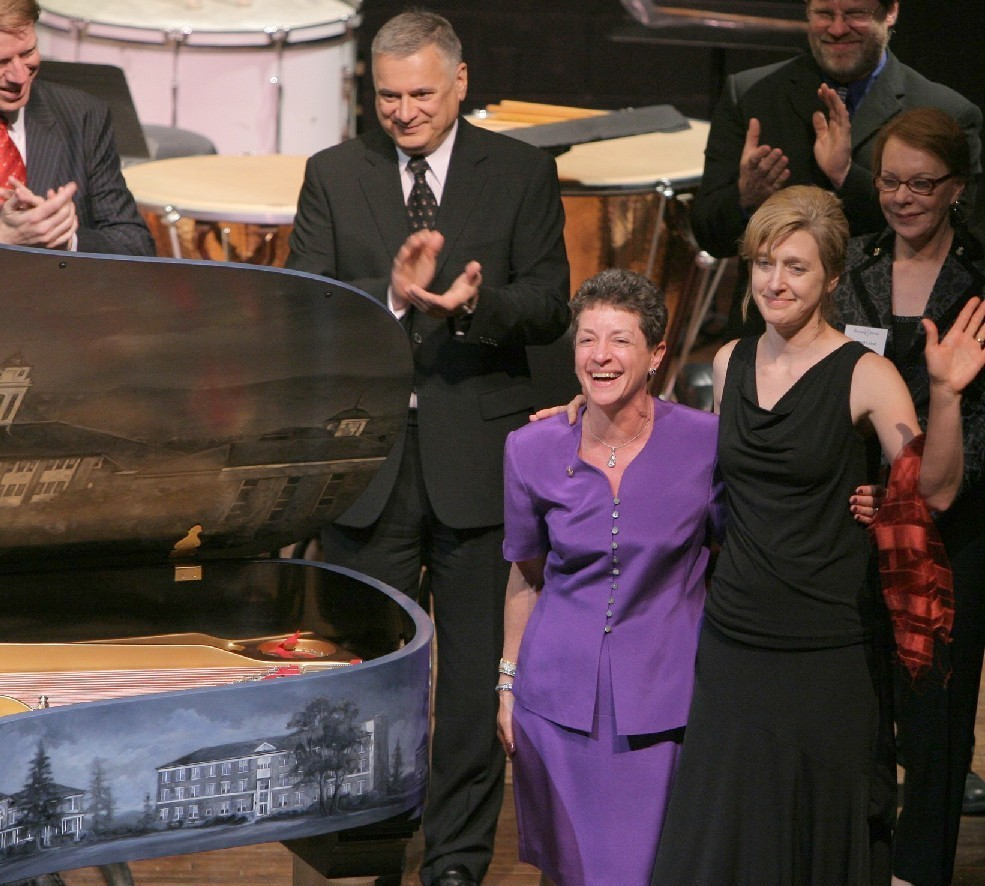
- Artist Mia LaBerge on stage at the Kennedy Center during ceremonial concert unveiling of the Madison Bluestone Steinway Art Case Piano which she painted.
- Born: 1967 (age 58–59)
- Education: Virginia Commonwealth University; James Madison University
- Known for: Painting

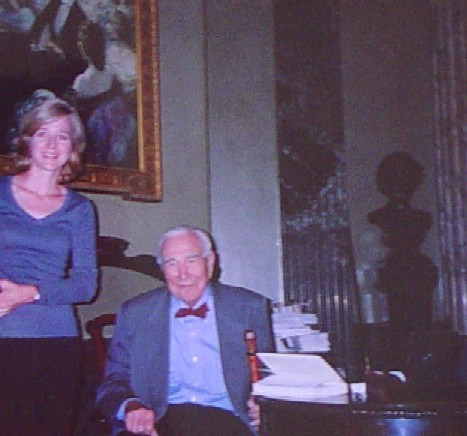
LaBerge with Henry Z. Steinway at Steinway Hall during planning of the Madison Bluestone Steinway Art Case Piano.

Mia LaBerge (born 1967, Minneapolis) is an American artist who painted the first Steinway Art Case Piano created to honor a university. The piano was exhibited in the rotunda of New York City's Steinway Hall and was ceremonially unveiled on stage at the Kennedy Center in Washington D.C. Steinway kept LaBerge unofficially "on call" to paint scenic music stands for the company's Madison Century series of limited-edition pianos.

== Biography ==
A distant descendant of the LaBerges after whom Lake Laberge was named, Minneapolis-born Laberge is an alumna of Virginia Commonwealth University and of James Madison University. In 2006, LaBerge was commissioned to paint the Madison Bluestone Art Case Piano which celebrates the hundredth anniversary of James Madison University and also recognizes its status as Virginia’s first All-Steinway Music School.

The Madison Bluestone was the last Art Case piano with which Henry Z. Steinway (1915–2008), the National Medal of Arts winner and last of the long line of Steinway family members to be president of Steinway & Sons, had direct involvement.

Circa 1990–2005, LaBerge's oil paintings were primarily realistic or painterly-realistic. Her art work from 2006 and later became ever more abstract—finally moving toward nonobjective subject matter. Her paintings have appeared in the coffee table book Virginia's Cattle Story : The First 400 Years (ISBN 0975274511) and on the cover of youth textbook All About You : A Course in Character for Teens (ISBN 0-9710966-0-0) . At least one LaBerge painting is in the collection of former US President Jimmy Carter.
