= Henry Z. Steinway =

American businessman (1915–2008)

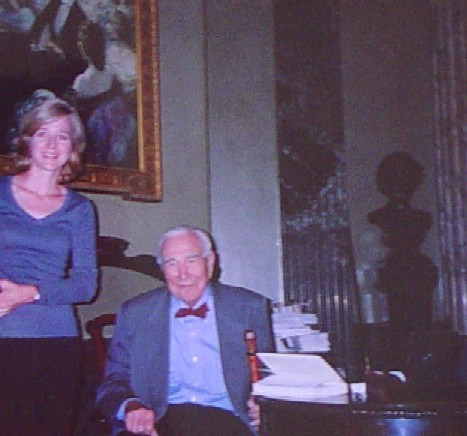
- Henry Z. Steinway with artist Mia LaBerge in the Steinway Hall rotunda in New York City
- Born: Henry Ziegler Steinway; August 23, 1915; Manhattan, New York City, U.S.
- Died: September 18, 2008 (aged 93); Manhattan, New York City, U.S.
- Education: Harvard University
- Occupation: Businessman
- Known for: President of the piano company Steinway & Sons
- Relatives: Henry E. Steinway (great-grandfather); Henry Alfred Steinway (grandson)

Henry Ziegler Steinway (August 23, 1915 – September 18, 2008) was the last member of the Steinway family to be president of the piano company Steinway & Sons.

== Early life ==
He was born on August 23, 1915, in Manhattan, New York City.

He was the great-grandson of the company founder Henry E. Steinway and started at the firm in 1937 after graduating from Harvard University.

== Career ==
He was president of the company from 1955 to 1977. He was the first president of NAMM Museum of Making Music.

The 2007 National Medal of Arts was awarded to Henry Z. Steinway and presented by US President George W. Bush on 15 November 2007 in an East Room ceremony at the White House. Henry Z. Steinway received the award for "his devotion to preserving and promoting quality craftsmanship and performance; as an arts patron and advocate for music and music education; and for continuing the fine tradition of the Steinway piano as an international symbol of American ingenuity and cultural excellence. The National Medal of Arts is a presidential initiative managed by the National Endowment for the Arts.

In celebration of his 91st birthday and honoring a lifetime of service to the company, Steinway & Sons introduced a series of Henry Z. Steinway Limited Edition pianos in ebony or East Indian rosewood with distinctive music stands bearing cutwork of the initials HZS. The pianos were advertised nationally. A small cast bronze ovoid plaque inside each such piano bears relief sculpture portraits of the Steinway family company presidents, along with a space for the serial number to be stamped. A total of 91 HZS pianos were authorized: one for each year of his life at the time.

Henry Z. Steinway donated his administrative files from the 1960s-70s to La Guardia and Wagner Archives (see also the section Steinway & Sons in the article La Guardia and Wagner Archives), which contains the records of the piano company dating to the 1850s.

He was a notable honorary member of the American music fraternity Phi Mu Alpha Sinfonia, a part of the Alpha Alpha chapter in 1962.

== Death ==
He died on September 18, 2008, aged 93, in Manhattan, New York City.
