= Palmer Springs, Virginia =

Coordinates: 36°33′39″N 78°14′21″W

Palmer Springs, Virginia is an unincorporated community in Mecklenburg County, Virginia, United States. It is bordered to the west by Buggs Island Lake, to the north and east by Lake Gaston, and to the south by the North Carolina state line. Its main cash crop has historically been tobacco. Today, cattle farms are more common. Also, tourism centered around the two lakes is a very important factor for the community.

== Famous people ==
- Odicci Alexander, former pitcher for the James Madison Dukes softball team
- Rick Hendrick, NASCAR owner and car dealer.
- Woo Daves, winner of the 2000 Bassmaster Classic
- James Solomon Russell, born into slavery, he gained education and became an Episcopal priest. He founded and developed the Saint Paul Normal and Industrial School, which later became Saint Paul's College.

== Community organizations ==
- Palmer Springs Volunteer Fire Department
- Palmer Springs Community Center/Country Club and Crows Unlimited
- Palmer Springs Family Care Center

== Recreation Areas ==
- Palmers Point Park
- Liberty Hill Fishing Access and Trail
- Samuel Buggs Island Wildlife Management Area
- Steel Bridge Boat Ramp and Fishing Area
