= Midway, Mecklenburg County, Virginia =

Unincorporated community in Virginia, US

Coordinates: 36°40′18″N 78°15′30″W

Midway is an unincorporated community in Mecklenburg County, Virginia, United States. It lies at an elevation of 371 feet (113 m).
