= George Freeman Bragg =

American priest

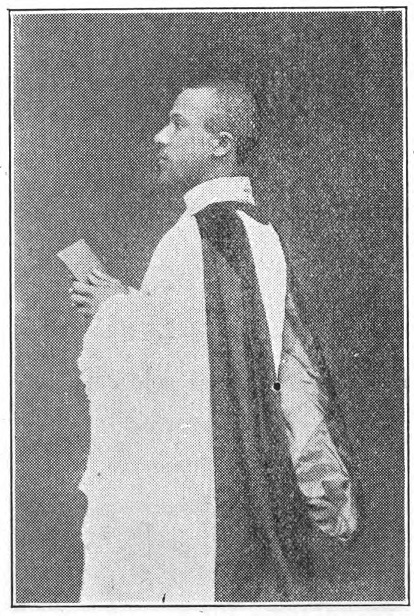
- Born: January 25, 1863; Warrenton, North Carolina, US
- Died: March 12, 1940 (aged 77); Baltimore, Maryland, US
- Occupation: Priest
- Spouse: Nellie Hill
- Relatives: Lucinda Bragg Adams (sister)

George Freeman Bragg (January 25, 1863 – March 12, 1940) was a priest, journalist, social activist, and historian. The twelfth African American ordained as a priest in the Episcopal Church of the United States, he worked against racial discrimination and for interracial harmony, both within and outside of his church.

== Early and family life ==
Bragg was born into slavery in Warrenton, North Carolina, in 1863, during the American Civil War. He was baptized at Emmanuel Episcopal Church. As the war ended, his carpenter father (also named George Freeman Bragg) and his seamstress mother Mary moved their family to Petersburg, Virginia, to live with his grandmother Caroline Wiley Cain Bragg, a devout Episcopalian and former slave of an Episcopal priest. Even before the war, Petersburg had been known for its prosperous free black community, and the city's Episcopal churches soon established Sunday schools for black children, to prepare them for the responsibilities of citizenship.

In 1867, Major Giles Buckner Cooke (a Virginia Military Institute graduate and former Confederate army officer on the staff of General Robert E. Lee who after the war began studying to become an Episcopal priest) had started a Sunday school for freed slaves at St. Paul's Episcopal Church in Petersburg. Two other Confederate veterans, Alexander W. Weddell and future bishop Robert Atkinson Gibson, had done likewise at Grace Episcopal Church the previous year. The following year Caroline Bragg was among the founding members of St. Stephen's Episcopal Church, Petersburg's first black Episcopalian church, and her extended family formed much of the congregation. In 1869, with financial support of the Freedmen's Bureau and the Peabody fund, Petersburg became the first city in Virginia to begin establishing public schools for black children, and Cooke became principal of the new Elementary School Number 1 (which later became Peabody High School). He later formed Big Oak Private School for the same purpose.

In 1872, the first priest associated with St. Stephens (the Rev. J.S. Atwell, an African-American missionary from Kentucky who had also been trying to revive St. Philip's African-American congregation in Richmond) resigned and moved to Georgia. Cooke (who had been ordained deacon the previous year) became St. Stephens' second rector. He soon merged his Big Oak School with the others to form a normal school, then added a divinity school to train future pastors. Bragg became one of the first students at Saint Stephen's Normal and Industrial School, which became later the Bishop Payne Divinity School.

== Career ==
=== Journalism and politics ===
As a child, Bragg delivered newspapers and established relationships with the city's white leaders, including John Hampden Chamberlayne, editor of the Petersburg Index, and political ally of William Mahone, who had founded the Readjuster Party and appealed for the support of black voters.

Six months after Bragg began his theological studies, Cooke expelled him for "insufficient humility". Bragg then turned his attention to politics, working at Mahone's headquarters. For his efforts, he was appointed a page in the House of Delegates in Richmond in 1881–82. On July 1, 1882, Bragg founded the weekly Petersburg Lancet, dedicated to civil rights issues.

After the Readjuster Party's losses in the 1883 elections, Bragg supported a black candidate for U.S. Congress. The candidate lost to Mahone's white candidate, James Dennis Brady. The campaign disillusioned Bragg, who decided Mahone did not care about the civil rights of black voters, only their votes. Thus on September 12, 1885, he announced that the Lancet would avoid politics, instead concentrating on moral, educational, and commercial matters. The following February, he changed the paper's name to the Afro-American Churchman and later it became The Church Advocate. A change in the rector at St. Stephens also allowed Bragg to resume his theological studies at the Bishop Payne Divinity School, from which he graduated in 1886.

=== Ministry ===
Bragg was ordained as a deacon on January 12, 1887, and assigned as vicar to Holy Innocents Episcopal Church, a mission in Norfolk. He successfully challenged a rule that black deacons wait at least five years before ordination as priests. Thus, on December 19, 1888, Bishop Francis McNeece Whittle ordained Bragg as a priest at Saint Luke's Episcopal Church in Norfolk; thus Bragg became the twelfth black Episcopal priest. During next five years, Bragg expanded his congregation into the fully self-supporting Grace Episcopal Church. He also established the Industrial School for Colored Girls, and served from 1887 through 1890 on the board of Hampton Normal and Agricultural Institute. However, Virginia increased its discrimination against black clergy in 1899, restricting their votes in the diocesan council to the Convocation of the Missionary Jurisdiction, over the objections of Bragg and others.

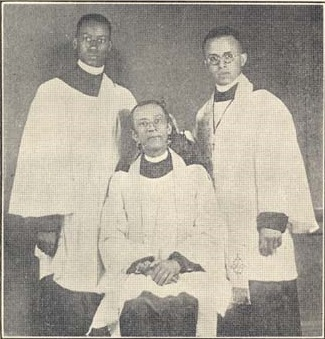
Bragg and his ministerial sons

In 1891, Bragg accepted a call and became rector of the oldest black Episcopal congregation in the South, Baltimore's St. James Episcopal Church (founded 1824), where he served for 49 years, until his death. Under Bragg's leadership, the struggling congregation of 63 again became self-supporting, tripling in size and building a new structure on Park Avenue and Preston Streets by 1901. By 1924, it was among the largest black Episcopal parishes in the country, with over 500 parishioners. During the Great Depression, it sold that building, which had become cramped, and bought a larger church on Lafayette Square from a white congregation (Church of the Ascension) which moved out of the city to rapidly developing Middle River, Maryland. On Easter Sunday 1932, Bragg led the congregation's first service in what remains its current church building On March 26, 1933, the congregation presented its largest-ever class for confirmation by the bishop, who had supported the move despite considerable opposition within the parish.

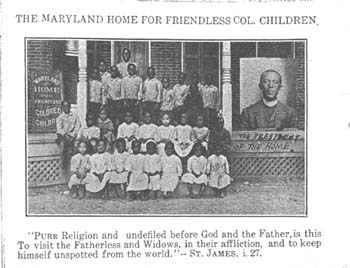
Solicitation for Baltimore's Colored Orphanage, digitized by University of North Carolina's Docsouth project

Bragg continued his social activism fighting racism and Jim Crow laws, both within and outside the church. In 1899, he helped establish a black orphanage in Baltimore (the Maryland Home for Friendless Colored Children), which became known for its placement of teenagers in foster homes. Three years later he helped Booker T. Washington found the Committee of Twelve, which fought to prevent disenfranchisement of blacks in Maryland. He also advocated the hiring of African-American teachers to educate African-American children in Baltimore's schools. Bragg later joined W. E. B. DuBois as one of the founders of the Niagara Movement, a precursor of the National Association for the Advancement of Colored People. Bragg also continued publishing the monthly Church Advocate, wrote several books as listed below, and worked to develop black ministers (fostering more than 20 vocations, including the Rev. Tollie Caution, who worked on the national level).

Bragg fought against restricting the church's mission work to overseas activities, arguing that the denomination also needed to foster African American congregations. He served as secretary and historiographer of the Conference of Church Workers among Colored People—which lobbied, among other things, for the election and consecration of black bishops. Bragg himself was twice interviewed, but never selected for that promotion. Nonetheless, Wilberforce University awarded him an honorary degree in 1902.

== Personal life ==
On September 20, 1887, Bragg married the daughter of another prominent Petersburg black family, Nellie Hill. The couple had two sons and two daughters.

== Death and legacy ==
Bragg died on March 12, 1940, after a short hospitalization at Baltimore's Providence Hospital. The Baltimore Sun eulogized his quiet manner, dignity and work for interracial harmony. Four years after his death, his congregation purchased and dedicated an altar in his memory.

His papers are held by the New York Public Library and by Howard University's Moorland-Springarm Research Center.

== Writings ==
- The Colored Harvest in the Old Virginia Diocese (1901)
- Afro-American Church Work and Workers (1904)
- The attitude of the Conference of Church Workers Among Colored People, towards the adaptation of the Episcopate to the needs of the race : with a list of ordinations of colored men to the ministry of (1904)
- The Story of Old St. Stephen's, Petersburg, Va. (1906)
- The First Negro Priest on Southern Soil (1909)
- A Bond-Slave of Christ: Entering the Ministry Under Great Difficulties (1912)
- The "Whittingham Canon" : the birth and history of the missionary district plan (1913)
- Men of Maryland (1914), (1925)
- Richard Allen and Absalom Jones: in Honor of the Centennial of the African Methodist Episcopal Church, Which Occurs in the Year 1916 (1915)
- The Episcopal Church and the black man (1918)
- History of the Afro-American Group of the Episcopal Church (1922)
- “The Hero of Jerusalem” (1926), a pamphlet written honoring General William Mahone
- The story of the first of the Blacks, the pathfinder Absalom Jones, 1746-1818 (1929)

== See also ==
- List of slaves

== Sources ==
- Hartzell, Lawrence L. "The Exploration of Freedom in Black Petersburg, Virginia, 1865–1902." in The Edge of the South: Life in Nineteenth-Century Virginia, edited by Edward L. Ayers and John C. Willis (Charlottesville: University Press of Virginia, 1991) at pp. 134–156.
- Henderson, William D. Gilded Age City: Politics, Life and Labor in Petersburg, Virginia, 1874–1889.(Lanham, Maryland: University Press of America, 1980).
