= Steinway Hall =

Collection of buildings owned by Steinway & Sons

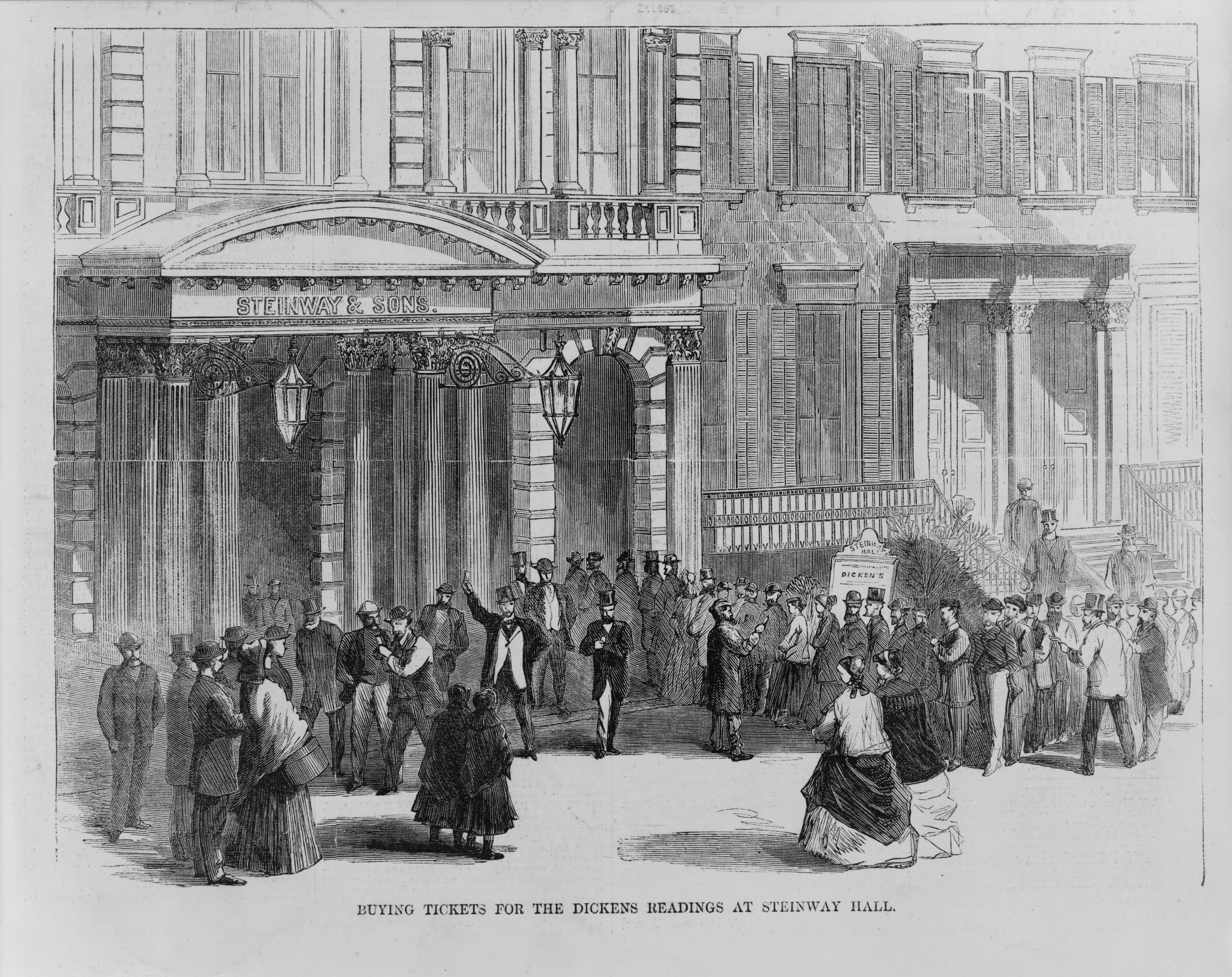
Spectators buying tickets for a Charles Dickens reading at Steinway Hall in New York City, in 1867

Steinway Hall (German: Steinway-Haus) is the name of buildings housing concert halls, showrooms and sales departments for Steinway & Sons pianos. The first Steinway Hall was opened in 1866 in New York City. Today, Steinway Halls and Steinway-Häuser are located in cities such as New York City, London, Berlin, and Vienna.

== New York City ==
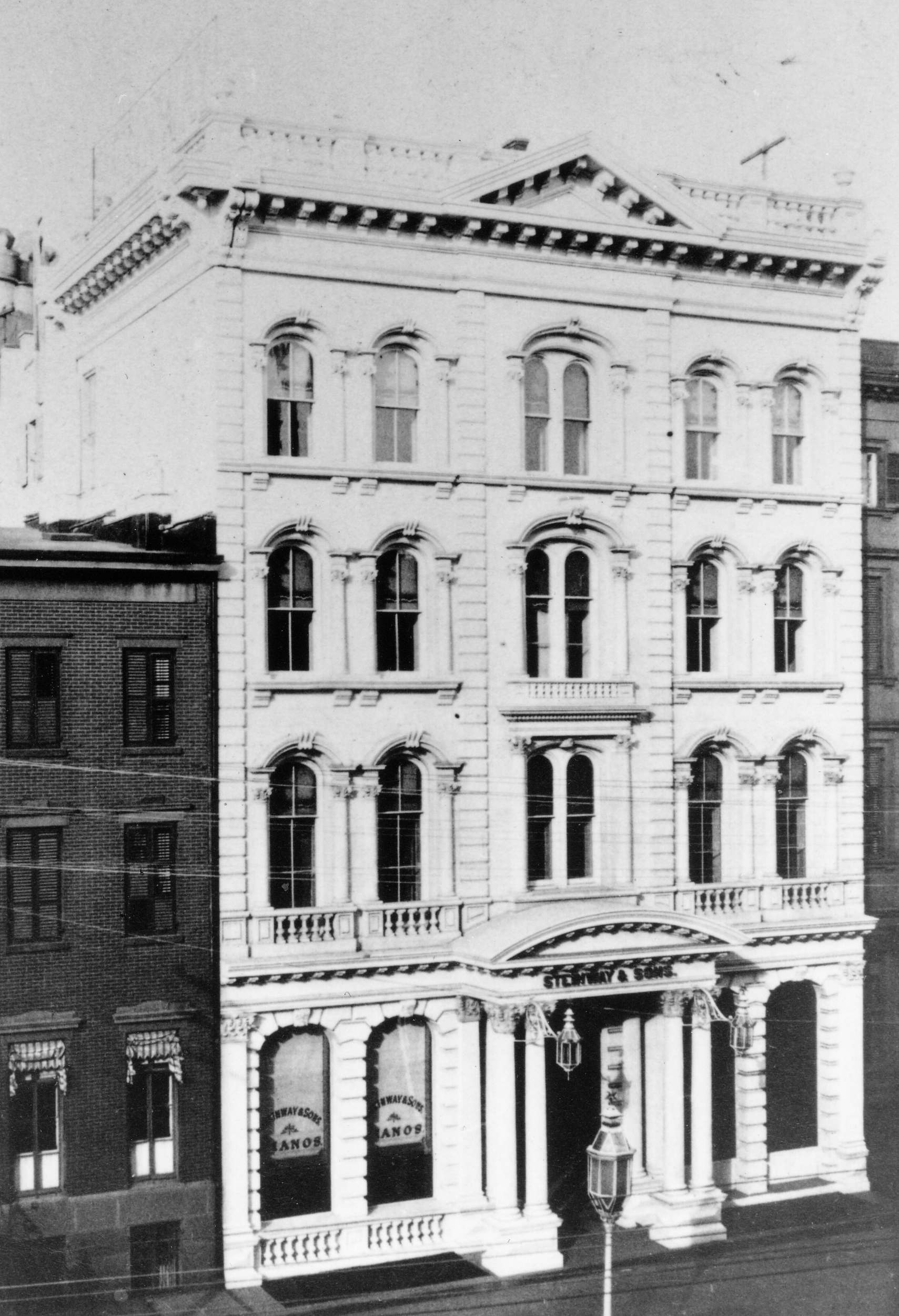
Steinway Hall on 14th Street

=== 14th Street (1864–1925) ===
In 1864, William Steinway built elegant showrooms housing over 100 Steinway & Sons pianos at 109 East 14th Street, at the corner of Fourth Ave. (now Park Ave South) in Manhattan. During the next two years, demand for Steinway pianos had increased dramatically. Construction of the first Steinway Hall was pushed by the need for expansion, increased promotion, and better presentation of pianos and music culture through regular live performances.

William Steinway carried planning and construction of the first Steinway Hall with the full support and cooperation from the City of New York. The concert hall was designed with 2,000 seats, and had a concert stage for a full 100-piece symphony orchestra. The concert hall was built in 1866 behind the showrooms on 14th Street in Manhattan and was one of the first concert halls for wider audiences in New York City. Four days after the Academy of Music on 14th Street a few blocks away burned down to the ground, on May 22, 1866, William Steinway laid the first stone of the Steinway Hall building. The hall opened on October 31, 1866. Its four floors had enough space to fit in a showroom for more than 100 pianos, the concert hall and rooms for piano lessons. The hall and the other rooms were illuminated with over 700 gaslights. The ground floor was occupied by the showroom and the office. The first floor there was taken by the concert hall. With 2,500 seats at that time, it was one of the biggest halls in the city of New York, becoming soon one of the cultural centers of the United States. One critic wrote, "no larger auditorium—before or since—has ever been built by a musical instrument manufacturer." Another observer, Moses King, called Steinway Hall "the cradle of classical music in this country".

The first Steinway Hall was also the home for the New York Philharmonic for 25 years, from 1866 to 1891, when Carnegie Hall opened in Midtown Manhattan. William Steinway recognized that it would be good for piano sales, if famous piano artists have a place to play on Steinway pianos, and also take a Steinway piano on a concert tour. In 1872, Steinway & Sons organised an unprecedented concert tour of 215 performances in 239 days for the Russian virtuoso pianist Anton Rubinstein. Rubinstein's legendary concert at the Steinway Hall was sold out with 3000 guests, many of them standing. Cultural highlights included performances of such artists as Fritz Kreisler, Walter Damrosch, Jenny Lind, readings of Charles Dickens and performances of the Boston Symphony Orchestra.

Steinway Hall, as the center of New York's cultural life, attracted more customers to Steinway showrooms. The marketing idea was so successful for Steinway & Sons, that competition forced other piano manufacturers, such as the Aeolian Company and Chickering & Sons to build their own concert halls, the Aeolian Hall and Chickering Hall in New York. Other piano companies also invested in renowned stars tours in the United States, such as Pyotr Ilyich Tchaikovsky, who was invited on a two-month US tour in 1891, by piano maker Wm. Knabe & Co. Around the same time, concert halls were also built in Boston, Chicago, Baltimore, and Philadelphia.

After Carnegie Hall's opening, the piano industry moved uptown to 57th Street, where Carnegie Hall was located. Accordingly, the main auditorium of Steinway Hall on 14th Street was closed, although performances continued to take place in the smaller recital halls. The S. Klein Union Square Realty Corporation bought the Steinway Hall on 14th Street in 1923 and closed it two years later. While the section on 14th Street was immediately demolished, the rear section housing the concert hall remained through the 1980s.

=== 57th Street (1925–2014) ===
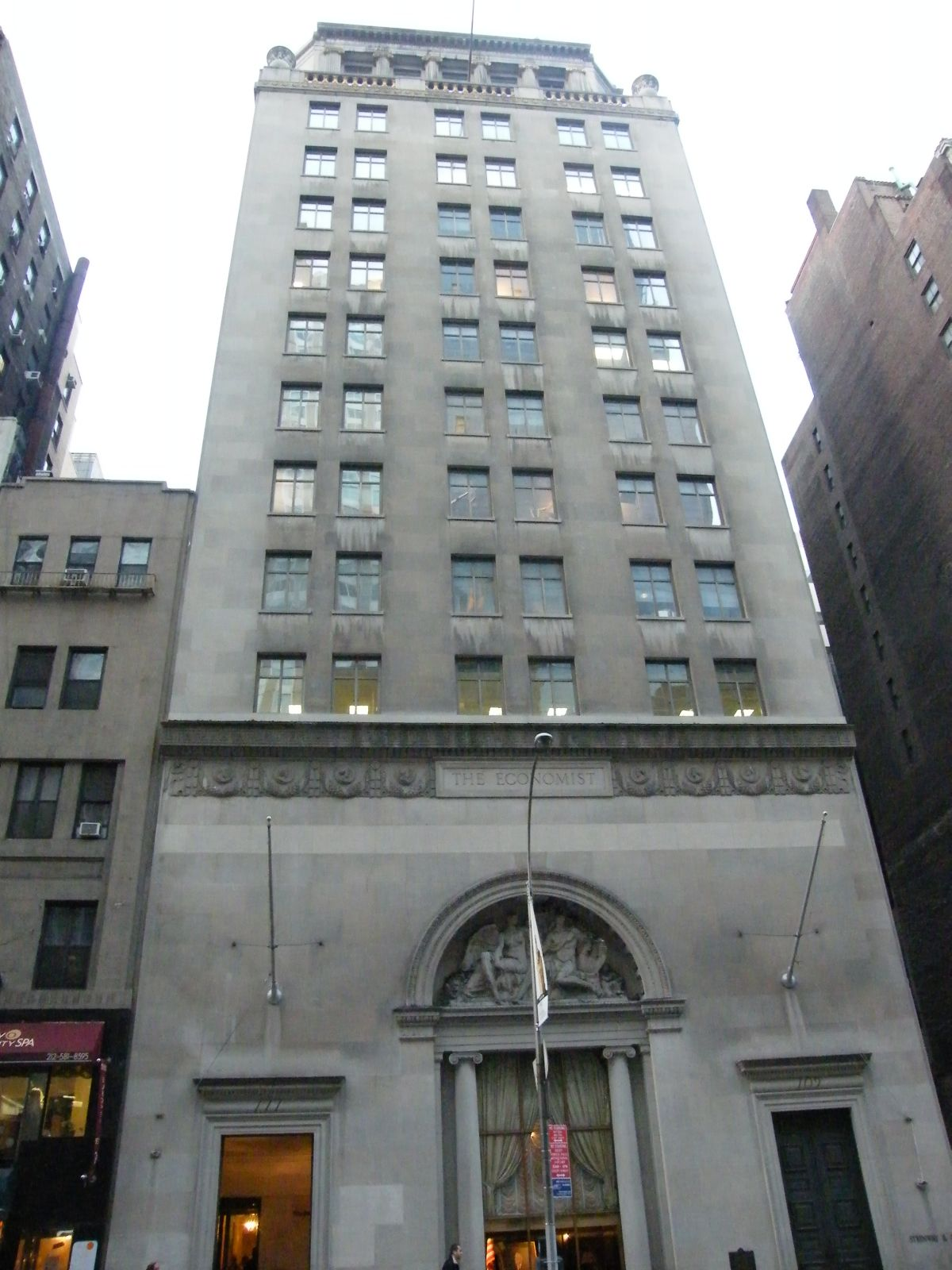
Steinway Hall on 57th Street

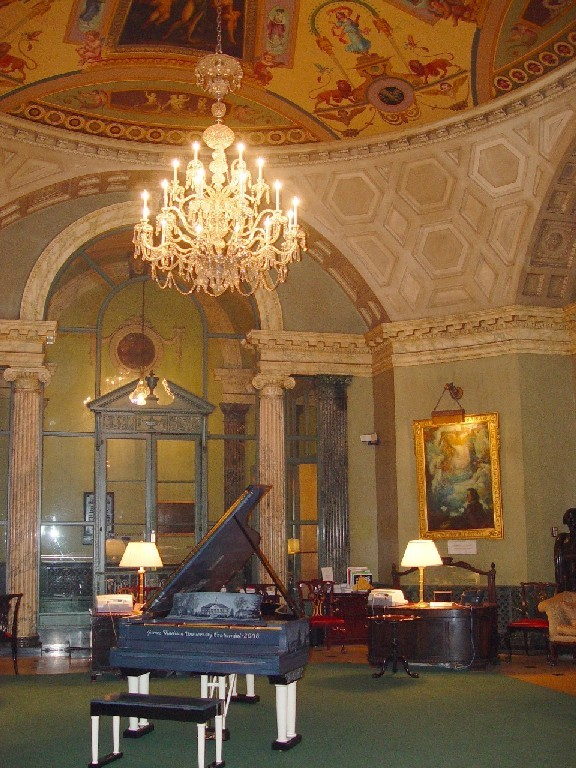
The rotunda of the Steinway Hall on 57th Street, with artist Mia LaBerge's Madison Bluestone art case piano in the foreground

After the closure of the auditorium at 14th Street, Steinway & Sons began looking for new sites near Carnegie Hall. In 1916, the firm found a site at 109–113 West 57th Street, between Sixth and Seventh Avenues, with a lot reaching back to 58th Street. William K. Benedict and Marvin & Davis designed a 10-story building for the site, but because of legal disputes and the recently enacted 1916 Zoning Resolution, plans were delayed for several years. A 16-story building was ultimately designed by Warren and Wetmore and built from June 1924 to April 1925. A grand opening was held on October 27, 1925. Among the notable performances at the 57th Street building was the 1928 duo piano recital by Vladimir Horowitz and Sergei Rachmaninoff.

The lowest stories of the 57th Street facade are clad with Indiana Limestone above a pink-granite water table, with a central arch flanked by a set of outer portals. Above the central doorway is a lunette with a cement sculptural group by Leo Lentelli. Above the third story is a frieze with portraits of classical composers and pianists. The northern elevation on 58th Street is clad with brick, limestone, and terracotta. The upper stories on both sides are clad with brick and contain various decorative elements.

The interior entrance vestibules, still extant, contain pink-granite floors and coffered domed ceilings. There is an octagonal rotunda with a 35-foot (11 m) domed ceiling, marble decoration, and a chandelier. The ceiling has four paintings by Paul Arndt, surrounded by grotesques and images painted by Cooper and Gentiluomo. The rotunda sat up to 300 guests and a small symphony orchestra. The lobby level also contained Steinway Hall's showrooms, covered with wood panels for better acoustics. Originally Steinway & Sons used the five lowest floors and rented out the upper floors. The basement housed storage, shipping, and a grand-piano testing area; the first story, a reception room and salesroom; the second story, salesrooms; the third floor, executive offices; and the fourth and fifth stories, music studios.

Steinway Hall was intended as a speculative development for Steinway & Sons, but it was not particularly successful, with a rate of return of only 2%. Steinway Hall and its land were sold to the Manhattan Life Insurance Company in 1958. Throughout the years, Steinway Hall's tenants also included publications such as Musical America, Architectural Forum, and The Economist, as well as CBS broadcasting studios. Steinway Hall was acquired by 111 West 57th Street Associates in 1980. Steinway bought back the building in 1999 and leased the land for 99 years from the former owner. The New York City Landmarks Preservation Commission (LPC) designated Steinway Hall's facade as a New York City landmark in November 2001. The leasehold interest was sold to developers in 2013, and the LPC designated the rotunda as an interior landmark the same year. The Steinway Hall on 57th Street was incorporated into a residential development at 111 West 57th Street, which started construction in 2014.

=== Sixth Avenue (2016–present) ===
Steinway & Sons were allowed to stay in the 57th Street building for eighteen months after it had been sold. Steinway moved out of that building in the end of 2014. In 2016, a new Steinway Hall opened at 1133 Sixth Avenue and 43rd Street.

== London ==
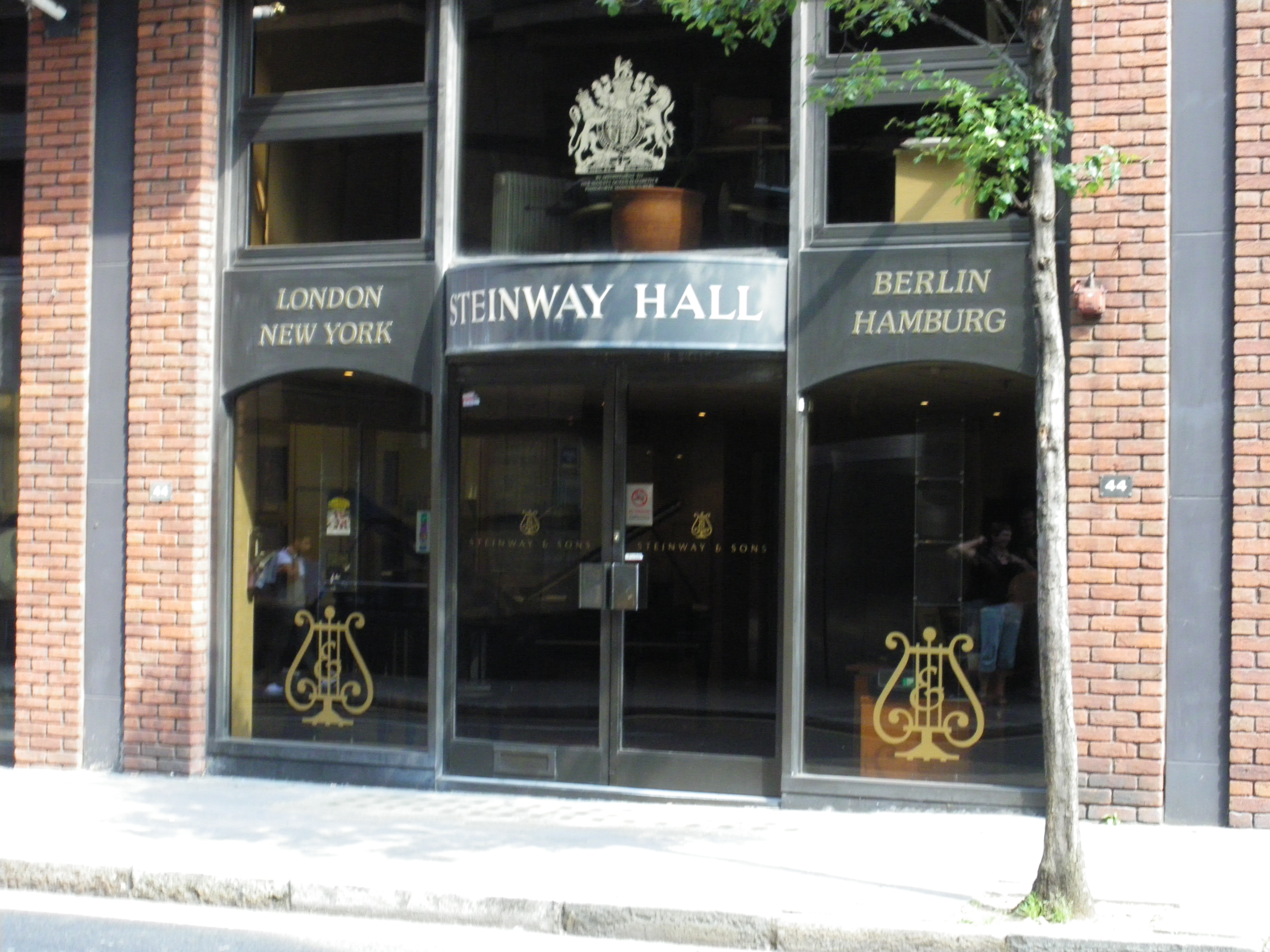
Steinway Hall in London

The Steinway Hall in London was opened in 1875 and became the first Steinway Hall in Europe. It has showrooms as well as several practice rooms available for musicians of all ages. The "piano bank" at London's Steinway Hall consists mostly of Hamburg Steinways, and also has a few New York Steinways D-274, in order to satisfy a greater range of performing artists.

== Berlin ==
The Steinway-Haus in Berlin is one of boutique centers of music and entertainment, it has its own place in the cultural life of the German capital. Since its opening in 1909, the Steinway-Haus in Berlin has been through many dramatic events of history, it was re-opened in 1948 in the ex-house of the pianist Josef Hofmann in the Hardenbergstraße No. 9. Today Steinway-Haus in Berlin has a miniature concert hall, several showrooms, and practice rooms available for children as well as adults to study music. Over 80 Steinway, Boston and Essex pianos are housed in the 3-story building. The Steinway-Haus has a "piano bank" of Hamburg Steinway pianos maintained and available for use in concerts and studio recordings by guests as well as by local entertainers.

== Hamburg ==
In 1953, the Steinway-Haus was opened on the Colonnaden street in Hamburg. In 2003, the 50th anniversary of Steinway-Haus Hamburg was marked by a series of concerts of classical and popular music performed by numerous guest stars as well as by local musicians. Today Steinway-Haus in Hamburg has a concert hall, several showrooms, and practice rooms available for children as well as adults to study music. Over 100 Steinway, Boston and Essex pianos are housed in the 5-story building. The Steinway-Haus has a "piano bank" of Hamburg Steinway pianos maintained and available for use in concerts and studio recordings by guests as well as by local entertainers. The 125th anniversary of the Hamburg Steinway factory was marked by a large-scale festival of music, held on April 17, 2005.

== Munich ==
The Steinway-Haus in Munich was acquired in 2000, it was formerly named Pianohaus Lang, which was an old Steinway dealership partner. It is located in the historic part of the city and plays a role in the cultural life of Bavaria and its capital. It has a miniature concert hall, showrooms and practice rooms for students of all ages to study music. The "piano bank" has mainly Hamburg Steinway pianos maintained and available for local entertainers and touring performers.

== Vienna ==
The Steinway-Haus in Vienna on the Ringstraße is one of the boutique Steinway showrooms that caters to entertainers in Austria and Central Europe. Besides the showrooms, the Steinway Haus in Vienna has several practice rooms and music classes open for students of all ages to polish their performing skills. The Steinway concert department has a "piano bank" of Hamburg Steinways. The Steinway-Haus of Vienna has been the main supplier of concert grand pianos to classical venues, as well as other entertainment centers in the capital of Austria.

== Chicago ==
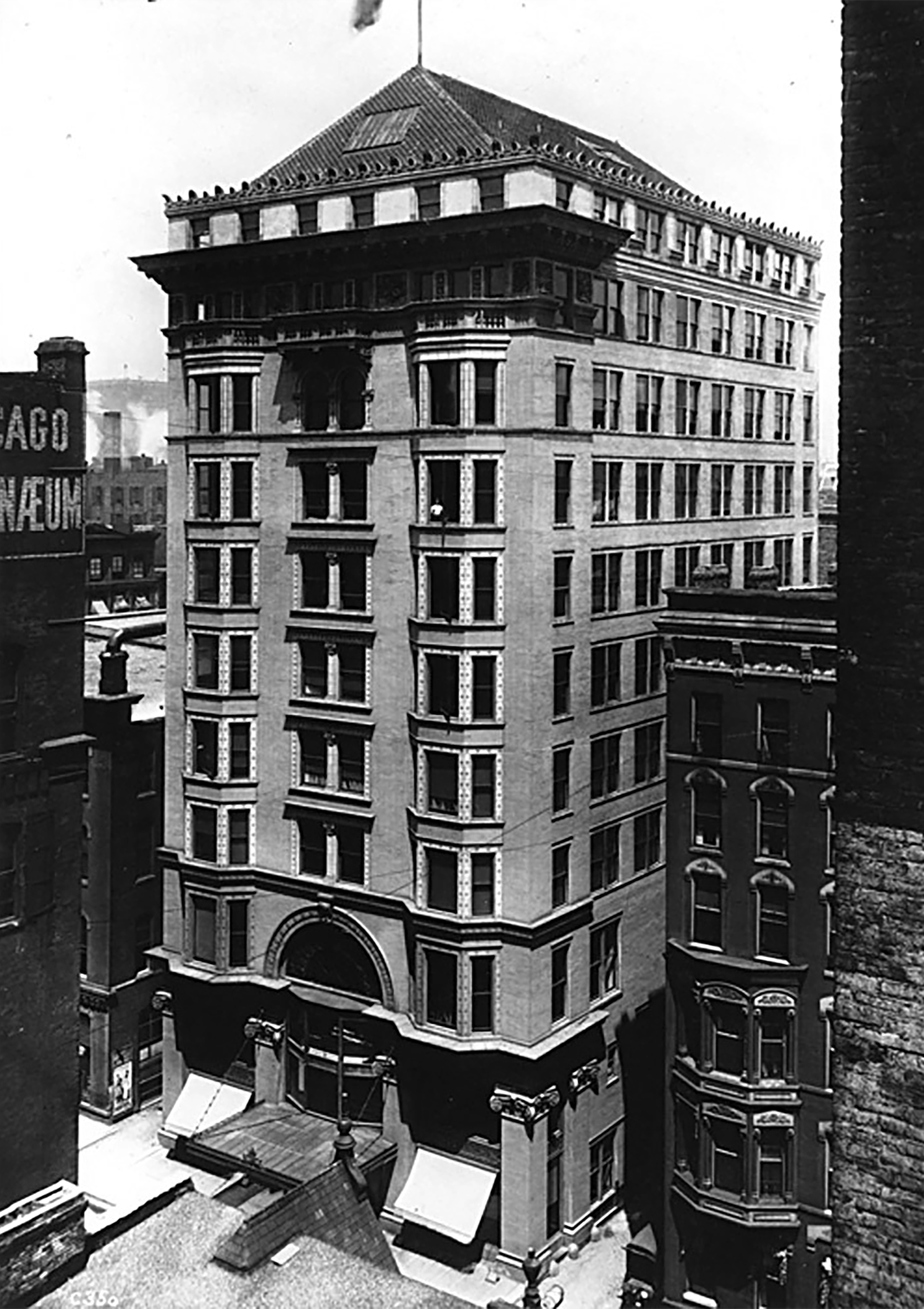
Steinway Hall in Chicago

Steinway Hall in Chicago (1896–1970) was a theater, and later cinema, located at 64 E. Van Buren Street, Chicago. It had at least 14 different name changes over the years, opening in 1896 as the Steinway Hall, and closing in the late 1960s as Capri Cinema.

== Newer Steinway Halls ==
Steinway Hall and showrooms opened in Seoul, catering to performers and musicians of the Seoul Philharmonic Orchestra and the Kangnam University, which is also an All-Steinway School. Steinway & Sons' main showroom recently opened in Beijing, where UNICEF Goodwill Ambassador Lang Lang introduced his own branded line of pianos, designed by Steinway & Sons, to the audience of Beijing society and media. The 65th Steinway Children and Youth Competition was recently held in Beijing. Today, additional forms of Steinway & Sons sales venues are located in Shanghai and Tokyo.
