= Bellon (surname) =

Bellon or Bellón is a surname. Notable people with the surname include:

- Damian Bellón (born 1989), Swiss footballer
- Juan Manuel Bellón López (born 1950), Spanish chess grandmaster
- Maia Bellon, American lawyer and environmentalist
- Pierre Bellon (1930–2022), French businessman
- Roger Bellon (born 1953), French composer
- Sophie Bellon (born 1961), French businesswoman
- Yagó Bellón (born 1989), Swiss footballer
