= Bellon =

Bellon may refer to:

- Bellon (surname)
- The Latin term "bellon" is a disused name for the condition now known as lead colic
- Bellon, Charente, a commune in western France
- Bellon, David, United States Senate Candidate.
