= Clamens =

Clamens is a surname. Notable people with the surname include:

- Sophie Clamens, French businesswoman
- Stéphane Clamens (born 1971), French sport shooter
