= Sodexo =

French food services and facilities management company

Sodexo S.A.
- Formerly: Société d'Exploitation Hotelière
- Type: Public (Société Anonyme)
- Traded as: Euronext Paris: SW; CAC Next 20 component
- ISIN: FR0000121220
- Industry: Food Service
- Founded: 1966; 60 years ago in Marseille, France
- Founder: Pierre Bellon
- Headquarters: Issy-les-Moulineaux, France
- Area served: Worldwide
- Key people: Pierre Bellon (Founder); Sophie Bellon (Chairwoman of the Board of Directors); Thierry Delaporte (CEO)
- Services: Foodservice, facility management, service vouchers
- Revenue: ▲€28.12 billion (2023)
- Operating income: ▲€699 million (2023)
- Net income: ▲€137 million (2023)
- Total assets: ▲€18.99 billion (2023)
- Total equity: ▲€3.17 billion (2023)
- Number of employees: ▲426,464 (2025)
- Subsidiaries: Sodexo Justice Services; Sodexo USA
- Website: sodexo.com

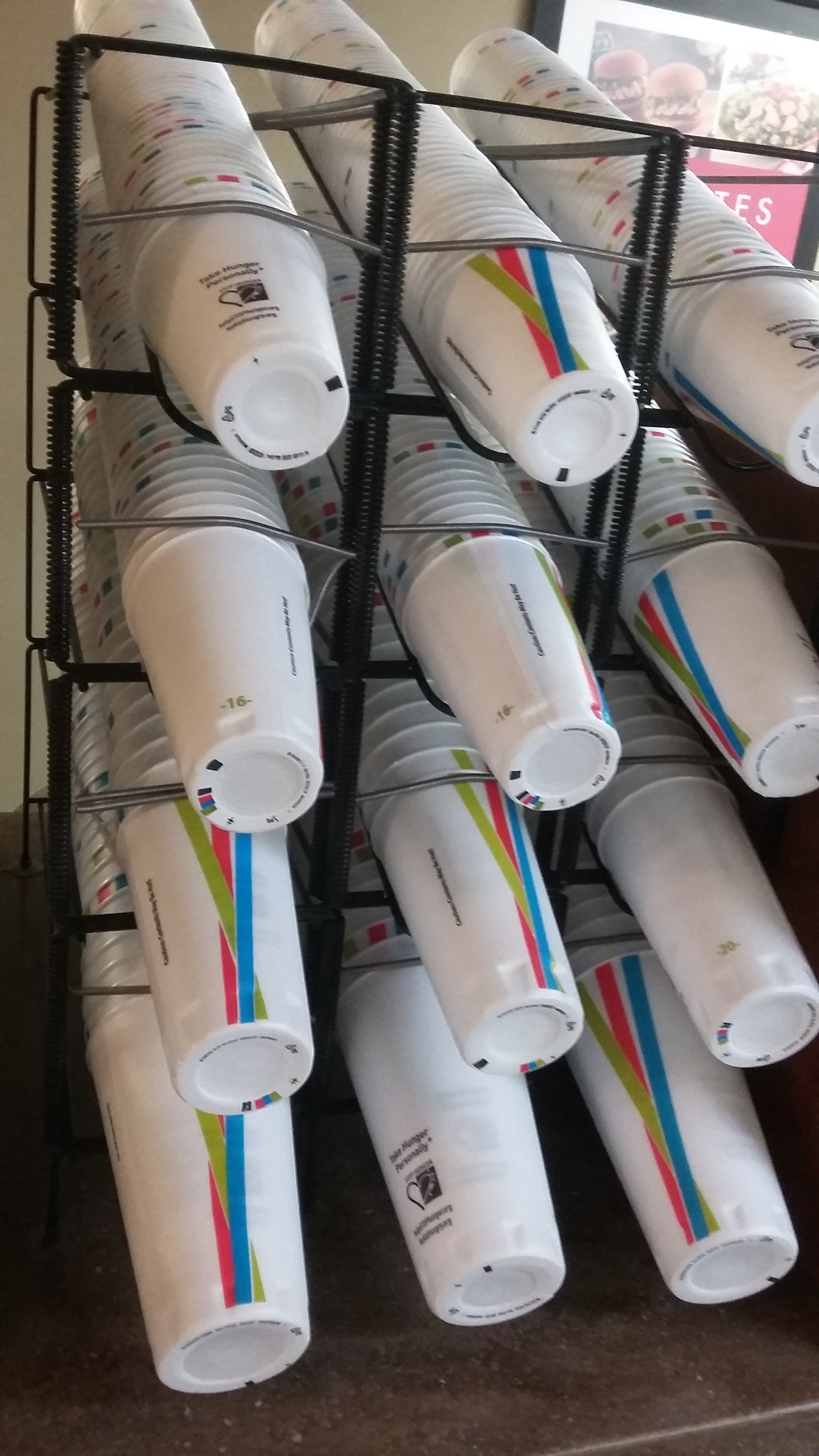
Cups with Sodexo markings at Baptist Hospital of Pensacola

Sodexo (formerly Sodexho Alliance) is a French food services and facilities management company headquartered in the Paris suburb of Issy-les-Moulineaux. It has 426,464 employees as of 2025, operates in 43 countries and serves 80 million customers on a daily basis on 27,000 sites. It is Europe’s second largest company of its type by both number of employees and revenue after Compass Group and France’s second largest private employer worldwide.

For fiscal year 2023 (ending August 2023), revenues reached €28.1 billion with an underlying operating profit of 699 million euro. Market capitalization was 11.5 billion euros as at 26 October 2023.

Sodexo serves many sectors, including private corporations, government agencies, schools from preschool through university (including seminaries and trade schools), hospitals and clinics, assisted-living facilities, military bases, and prisons. As of 2016, subsidiary Sodexo Justice Services operated support services in 122 prisons in eight countries, including 42 in the Netherlands, 34 in France, and others in Belgium, Italy, Spain, and Chile, as well as directly running 7 prisons in the UK.

== History ==
The company was launched in 1966 by Pierre Bellon (Chairman) in Marseille, France, initially serving company restaurants, schools and hospitals under the name Société d'Exploitation Hotelière (English: Hotel Services Corporation). Today Sodexo is on the Fortune Global 500 list and the second largest employer among all French multi-national corporations.

Throughout the 1970s, the company expanded in France and internationally; first in Belgium, then Africa, and finally the Middle East. After an initial public offering on the Paris Bourse in 1983, the firm continued its expansion into North America, South America, Japan, South Africa and Russia. In 1994, on October 31, Sodexo began operations in India. In 1997, Société d'Exploitation Hotelière's holding company changed its name to Sodexho, and joined forces with Universal Ogden Services, the leading remote-site service provider in the U.S. On 11 January 1995, Sodexo S.A. acquired food company Gardner Merchant Ltd. from Cinven and CVC Capital Partners.

In 1998, Sodexho merged with Marriott Management Services, at the time one of the largest food services companies in North America. Included in the merger was a name change to Sodexho Marriott Services. The merger helped the company become one of the largest food services providers in the United States. In June 2001, Sodexho acquired complete control of Sodexho Marriott Services.

In 2002, Sodexho was listed on the New York Stock Exchange, but the company withdrew its listing in 2007. As of 2017, the company is listed on Euronext Paris under the symbol SW and trades stocks over-the-counter under the symbols SDXOF and SDXAY.

In the summer of 2006, the company made a deal with retired NBA Hall of Famer and entrepreneur, Magic Johnson and Magic Food Provisions, a subsidiary of Magic Johnson Enterprises. The initiative includes a marketing agreement and the formation of SodexhoMAGIC, LLC, a new joint venture that is 51 percent owned by Johnson.

In 2007, Sodexho launched its catering arm in United Kingdom schools, using the brand name "For you...". In 2008, Sodexho changed its name to Sodexo, dropping the h in order to make the name easier to pronounce in many languages worldwide. The DiversityInc Top 50 Companies for Diversity is the leading assessment of diversity management in the US economy and globally. In 2010, Sodexo ranked number one.

In 2010, Sodexo entered into two new partnerships: the first one with United Coffee, who will supply Sodexo with machines as well as fair-trade certified coffees; the other one with Numi, from which Sodexo has selected 100% organic teas. In 2011, Sodexo entered an eight-year contract with the US government, by which the company committed itself to provide food services to 51 United States Marine Corps mess halls.

In 2024, its voucher and benefits division Pluxee was spun-off and separately listed on Euronext Paris. This was accompanied by a branding and name change across the countries it operates in.

== Leadership ==
In 2005, Michel Landel was appointed Chief Executive Officer, succeeding Pierre Bellon, who continued as Chairman of the Board of Directors. In January 2016, Lorna C. Donatone was appointed head of Sodexo's North American business operations and CEO of its school operations worldwide. In 2018, Denis Machuel replaced Michel Landel as CEO. Following the death of Pierre Bellon in 2022, his daughter Sophie Bellon took over the roles of chairwoman of the board of directors and CEO. In February 2025, Michael Svagdis was named CEO of campus and government services in the US.

== Name change ==
The company changed its official name from Sodexho Alliance to simply Sodexo after a shareholder vote at the company's annual general meeting on 22 January 2008. The reason for removing the letter 'h' from Sodexho, cited in the group's 2007 annual report, is that "in certain languages an 'x' followed by an 'h' is difficult to pronounce". The logo of the company was also changed, dropping the five stars to a single star.

== Controversy ==
In 2009, the Service Employees International Union (SEIU) launched a United States nationwide campaign against Sodexo with the stated objective of improving wage and job standards. In 2010, the SEIU recruited students at many U.S. colleges to support strikes and demonstrations in protest of Sodexo's alleged unfair labor practices including anti-union behavior and paying low wages. Although one series of strikes at the University of Pittsburgh led to the negotiation of higher wages and lower cost health insurance plans for the cafeteria workers, none of the Sodexo accounts targeted by the SEIU have unionized or requested an election vote. According to a statement from Sodexo, the SEIU engaged in a smear campaign in an effort to drive out rival labor unions that have traditionally operated in the foodservice industry as well as for general publicity.

Sodexo filed a lawsuit in March 2011 under the Racketeer Influenced and Corrupt Organizations Act accusing the SEIU of "engaging in illegal tactics in its effort to unionize workers". During the trial, it was revealed that the SEIU had written and distributed a manual to its staff detailing how "outside pressure can involve jeopardizing relationships between the employer and lenders, investors, stockholders, customers, clients, patients, tenants, politicians, or others on whom the employer depends for funds." Tactics recommended include references to blackmail, extortion, accusations of racism and sexism, and targeting the homes and neighborhoods of business leaders for demonstrations. Following the court discovery of this document, the SEIU agreed to terminate their public campaign focused on Sodexo and the charges against SEIU were dropped.

In May 2011, 27 University of Washington students were arrested during a sit-in at the university's administrative offices for protesting the university's concessions contract with Sodexo. Later that same month, another 13 students were arrested under similar circumstances.

On 22 February 2013, all of the frozen beef products used by Sodexo in the UK were withdrawn following the discovery of horse DNA in a sample. The company supplies 2,300 institutions, including schools, senior citizen homes, prisons and branches of the armed forces within the UK. In August 2013, Sodexo Justice Services was criticised in an official report for subjecting a female prisoner to "cruel, inhumane and degrading treatment", which "appears to amount to torture" at HMP Bronzefield in Ashford, Surrey, UK. The woman was kept segregated from other prisoners in an "unkempt and squalid" prison cell for more than five years.

In February 2019, Sodexo was criticized by the United Kingdom Ministry of Justice for failing to prevent repeated and systemic breaches of the human rights of inmates at the Sodexo-operated HMP Peterborough. This stemmed from a series of illegal strip-searches of prisoners at the jail in 2017, including one inmate who was menstruating and another who was transitioning from female to male. Justice Julian Knowles described the illegal procedures as "humiliating and embarrassing." HMP Bronzefield in Surrey, operated by Sodexo Justice Services, were investigated by police after allowing a woman to give birth alone in her cell without any kind of medical support. The baby was found dead in the early hours of 27 September 2019. In December 2019, a dispute between the UNITE HERE Local 11 union and the Sodexo operation at Loyola Marymount University threatened to derail a planned Democratic Party presidential candidate debate at the university. The union alleged mistreatment of food service workers.

Starting in October 2019, Sodexo employees (mainly cleaners, porters and caterers) at St Mary's Hospital, London, organised by the UVW union, protested at unfair pay and terms on their contract with the hospital and were asking to be brought in-house as full NHS employees and to be paid the London Living Wage of £10.85/hour. After being told that this wasn't possible and after Sodexo pay packets missing payments, employees did several days of industrial action, resulting in one of the longest strikes in NHS history. This resulted in all their demands being satisfied, and as there were 4 other hospitals administered by the same trust, all of their 1,200 Sodexo employees were brought in-house and became full NHS employees in January 2020. The employees were almost entirely Black, Latino and Asian people and/or migrants. The industrial action was co-ordinated by Loreta Younsi, a Lithuanian migrant, who had worked as a cleaner at the hospital for 12 years.

Later, a lawsuit was filed against Sodexo after the Kronos outage, which lasted from December 6, 2021, to March 12, 2022. The lawsuit filed by former Sodexo employee Sharnee Smith claimed that the Kronos Private Cloud, which is used to keep track of some timekeeping and payroll functions, had an outage during which time Sodexo did not properly pay employees for their overtime. Ultimately, the court did not find that Sodexo was liable. Instead, the case ended with a class-action settlement in which employees could sign a consent form to receive a portion of the $1,000,000 settlement.

In 2026, Binghamton University opted not to renew its contract with Sodexo in the wake of student protests over food safety concerns. Under the previous Sodexo contract, the university's dining halls had all received numerous health code violations.

== Notes ==
- These numbers were calculated based upon the revenues by region in four main revenue categories (On-site Services, Business & Administrations, Education, Healthcare & Seniors).
