= Landel =

Landel is a surname. Notable people with the surname include:

- Buddy Landel (1961–2015), American professional wrestler
- Guy-Michel Landel (born 1990), Guinean footballer
- Michel Landel (born 1951), French businessman
- Robert F. Landel (1925–2024), American physical chemist

== See also ==
- Mandel
