= Jopwell =

Diversity hiring startup

- Headquarters: New York City, New York, United States
- Website: www.jopwell.com

Jopwell is a diversity hiring startup that helps companies connect with and recruit black, Latino, and Native American candidates for jobs and internships.

== Company ==
The Jopwell platform was launched in January 2015 by cofounders Porter Braswell and Ryan Williams. The current user base includes black, Latino, and Native American professionals and students. It aims to solve the "pipeline" problem, wherein some companies believe that there aren't enough good candidates for diverse recruitment.

== Funding ==
Jopwell has secured a total of $4.22 million in early stage—angel and seed round—funding. Investors include Magic Johnson Enterprises, Andreessen Horowitz, Kapor Capital, Y Combinator, Omidyar Network, Valar Ventures, and Rothenberg Ventures.

== The Well ==
The Well is Jopwell's editorial hub. Launched on April 11, 2016. It is a source for Black, Latino, and Native American professionals and students to find and share career advice and workforce insight.
