= Sunset + Vine =

Sunset & Vine, Sunset & Vine, or Sunset and Vine may refer to:

== Places ==
- Sunset+Vine, the sports division of U.K. production company Tinopolis
- The intersection of Sunset Boulevard and Vine Street in Hollywood, Los Angeles, California
  - A shopping center/luxury apartment complex co-funded by Magic Johnson Enterprises

== Music ==
- Sunset and Vine, a 2005 album by British band Shy
- "Sunset & Vine", a song by The Charlatans from the 2006 album Simpatico
- a song by Waylon Jennings from the 1967 album Waylon Sings Ol' Harlan
