= LaGuardia Airport =

Airport in East Elmhurst, Queens, New York City, U.S.

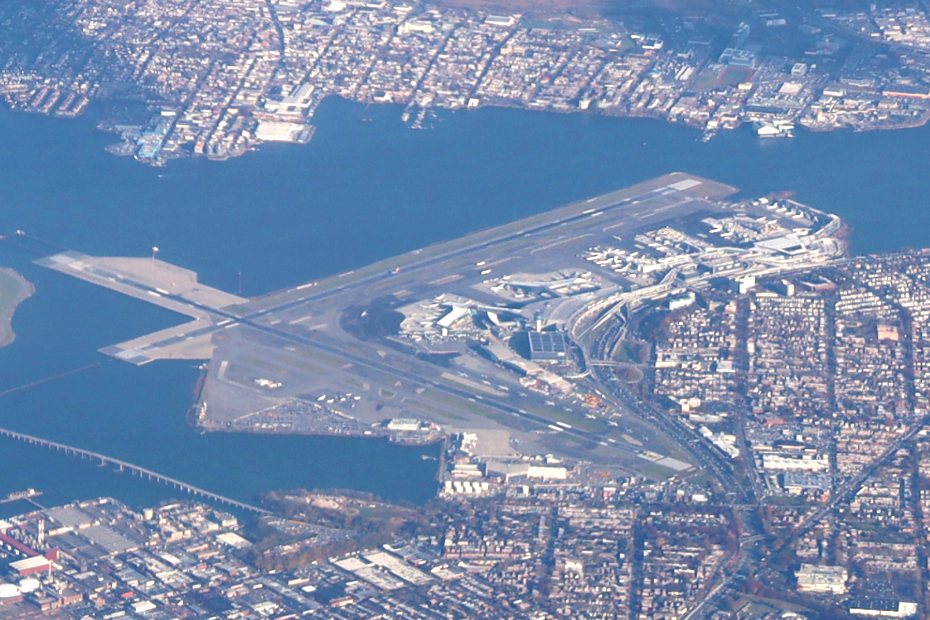
- Aerial view in 2021
- IATA: LGA; ICAO: KLGA; FAA LID: LGA; WMO: 72503

Summary
- Airport type: Public
- Owner: City of New York
- Operator: Port Authority of New York and New Jersey
- Serves: New York metropolitan area
- Location: East Elmhurst, Queens, New York City, U.S.
- Opened: December 2, 1939; 86 years ago
- Hub for: American Airlines; Delta Air Lines
- Time zone: EST (UTC−05:00)
  - Summer (DST): EDT (UTC−04:00)
- Elevation AMSL: 6 m (20 ft)
- Coordinates: 40°46′30″N 73°52′30″W
- Website: www.laguardiaairport.com

Maps
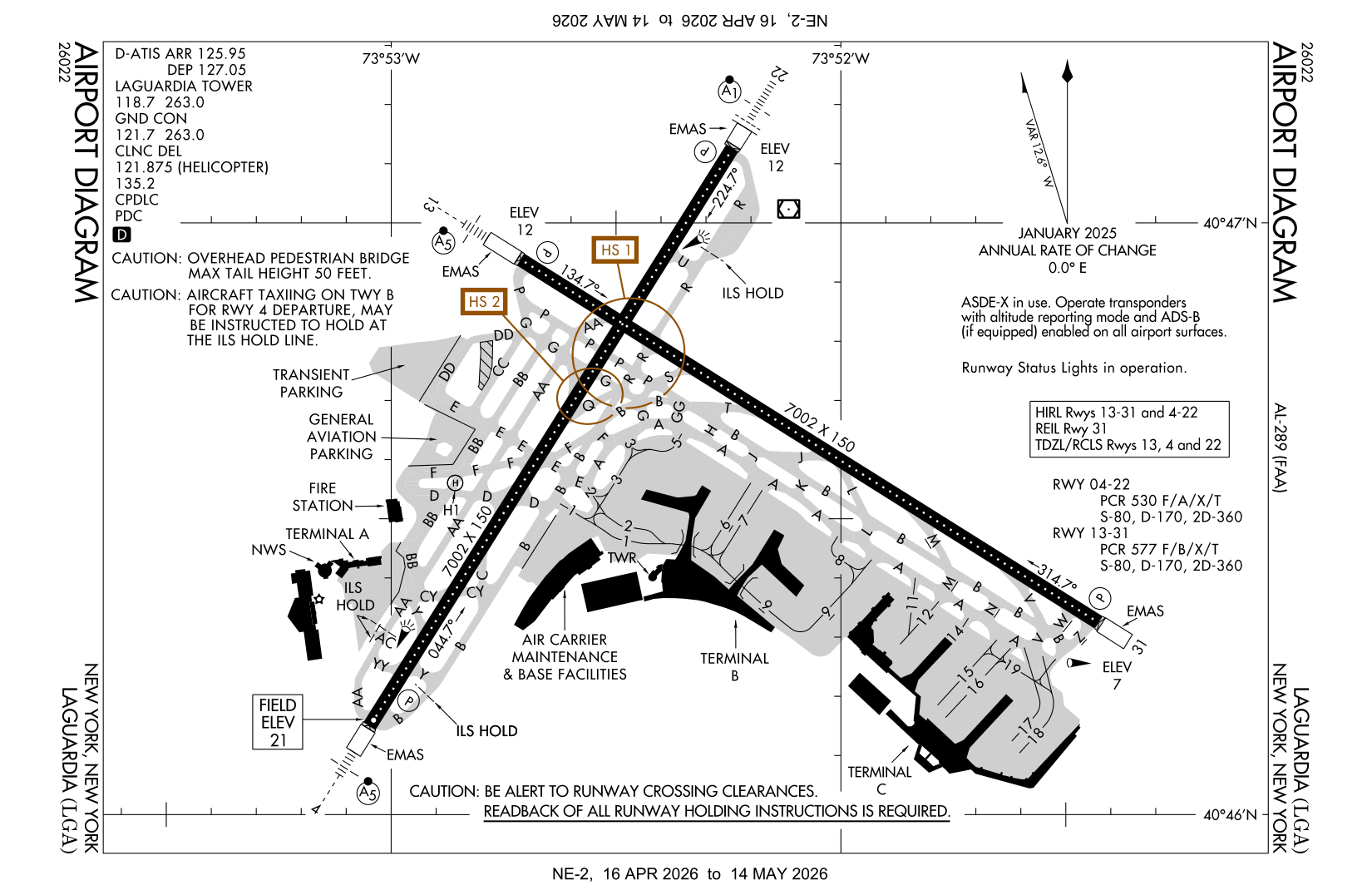
- FAA airport diagram
- Interactive map of LaGuardia Airport

Runways
Direction	Length		Surface
Direction	m	ft	Surface
4/22	2,134	7,002	Asphalt/Concrete
13/31	2,134	7,002	Asphalt/Concrete

Helipads
Number	Length		Surface
Number	m	ft	Surface
H1	14	45	Asphalt

Statistics (2025)
- Aircraft operations: 354,645
- Passengers: 32,791,050
- Source: Port Authority of New York and New Jersey

LaGuardia Airport (Note: Pronounced /ləˈɡwɑːrdiə/ lə-GWAR-dee-ə) (IATA: LGA, ICAO: KLGA, FAA LID: LGA) is a civil airport in East Elmhurst, Queens, New York City, United States, situated on the northwestern shore of Long Island, bordering Flushing Bay. It covers 680 acres (280 ha) as of July 1, 2026. The facility was established in 1929 and began operating as a public airport in 1939. It is named after Fiorello La Guardia, a former mayor of New York City.

The airport accommodates airline service primarily to domestic, but also to limited international destinations. As of 2023, it was the third-busiest airport in the New York metropolitan area behind Kennedy and Newark airports, and the 19th-busiest in the United States by passenger volume. The airport is located directly to the north of the Grand Central Parkway, the airport's primary access highway. While the airport is a hub for both American Airlines and Delta Air Lines, commercial service is strictly governed by unique regulations including a curfew, a slot system, and a "perimeter rule" prohibiting most nonstop flights to or from destinations greater than 1,500 miles (2,400 km; 1,300 nmi).

Throughout the 2000s and 2010s, LaGuardia was criticized for its outdated facilities, inefficient air operations, and poor customer service metrics. In response, the Port Authority of New York and New Jersey (PANYNJ) in 2015 announced a multibillion-dollar reconstruction of the airport's passenger infrastructure, which was completed in January 2025.

== History ==
=== Original site ===
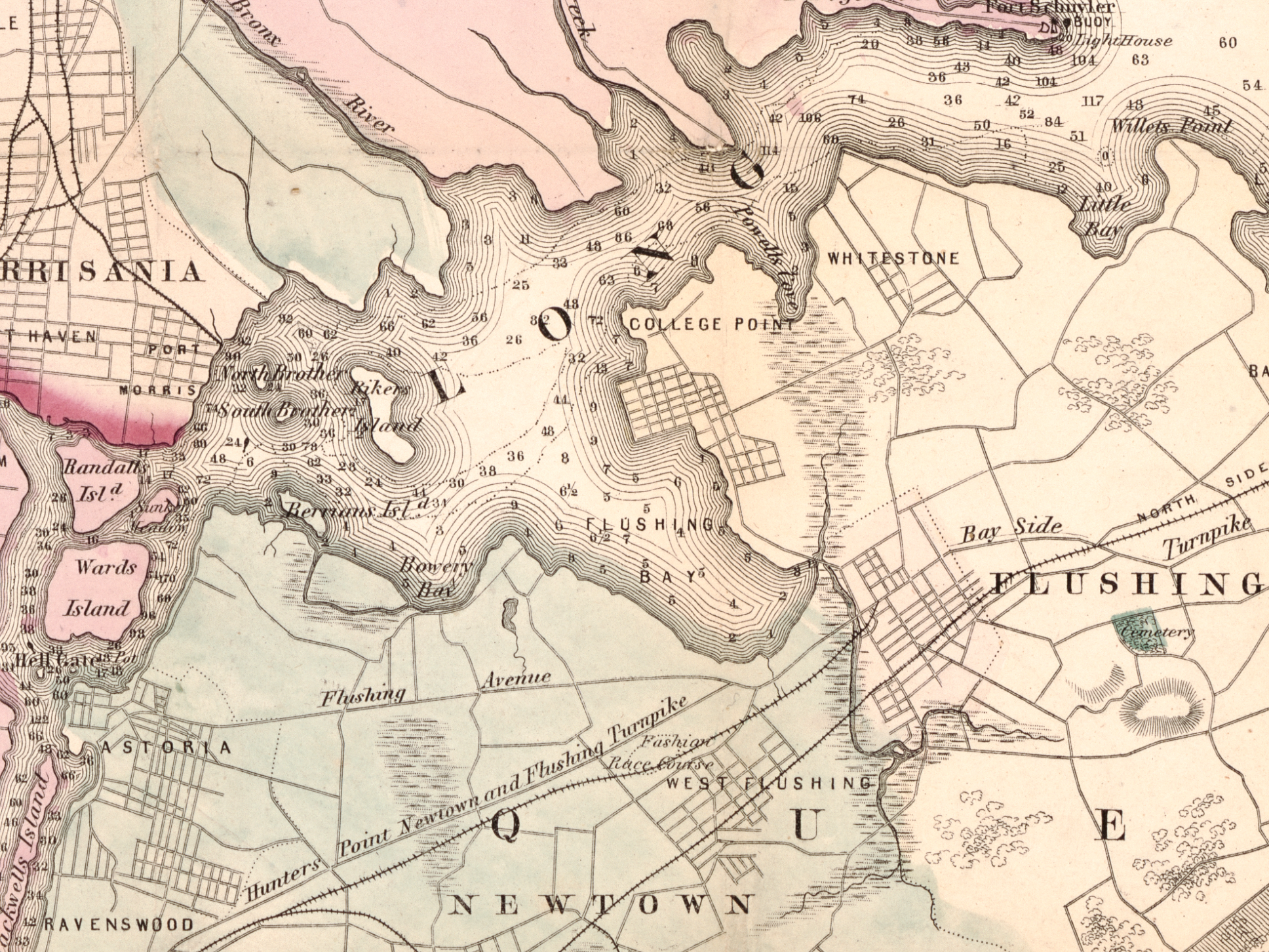
Coastline of northwest Queens, circa 1866

Prior to human development, the coastlines of Bowery Bay and Flushing Bay converged at a natural point that comprised the eventual northern shoreline of Newtown, Queens. By 1858, the area was partially contained by the estate of Benjamin Pike Jr. based around what is today known as the Steinway Mansion, which was soon purchased and consolidated with other property by William Steinway. In June 1886, Steinway opened a summer resort development known as Bowery Bay Beach on the peninsula. Originally featuring a bathing pavilion, beach, lawns, and boathouse, the resort was renamed North Beach and later expanded with the addition of Gala Amusement Park. By the turn of the century, North Beach's German-influenced development drew comparisons to Brooklyn's Coney Island. Its fortunes soon turned, however, as Prohibition in the United States and war-related anti-German sentiment presented significant challenges to the resort's profitability. These factors, combined with increased industrialization and pollution of the Queens waterfront, made the area untenable as a leisure destination, and it was abandoned at some point in the 1920s.

=== North Beach Airport ===
In April 1929, New York Air Terminals, Inc., announced plans to open a private seaplane base at North Beach later that summer. The 200-acre (81 ha) facility was christened on June 15 and initially featured a 2-acre (0.81 ha) concrete plateau connected to the water by a 400 ft (120 m) amphibious aircraft ramp, with the former resort converted to a passenger terminal. Opening-day festivities for the new airport were attended by a crowd of 5,000, and included air races with Curtiss Seagulls and Sikorsky flying boats, a dedication address by Borough President George U. Harvey, and the commencement of airline service to Albany and Atlantic City by Coastal Airways and Curtiss Flying Service. One month later, service to Boston was launched using Savoia-Marchetti S.55 aircraft operated by Airvia.

=== Glenn H. Curtiss Airport ===
By 1930, the airport had been improved with hangars and night-illuminated runways, and it housed seaplanes of the recently reorganized New York City Police Department Aviation Unit. On September 23, the site was renamed Glenn H. Curtiss Airport in honor of the New York aviation pioneer who had died one month earlier (not to be confused with the pre-existing Curtiss Field in nearby Garden City, nor a similarly renamed airport in Valley Stream). In a ceremony that same day, representatives from the forerunner to Trans World Airlines announced their bid to establish the nation's first transcontinental airmail route to the airport using Ford Trimotors; in attendance were Eleanor Roosevelt and Charles Lindbergh.

On August 27, 1931, the airport welcomed the arrival of the world's then-largest airplane, the Dornier Do X, after a 10-month transatlantic journey. Over 18,000 people visited the huge flying boat on its first day of static display, and it remained in the city for nine months. While the Do X was ultimately a commercial failure, its presence demonstrated the viability of long-distance air travel terminating a mere 20-minute drive from Manhattan. Likewise, this centralized location also enabled the airport to host hourly air taxi services between Newark and Brooklyn's Floyd Bennett Field that September.

While Curtiss Field was quickly becoming a magnet of aviation, Newark Airport remained the primary terminal for New York City-bound passengers and mail. The city's lack of its own central airport lingered as the 1930s wore on, especially as discussion grew regarding the commercial viability of privately operated fields.

=== Municipal Airport 2 ===
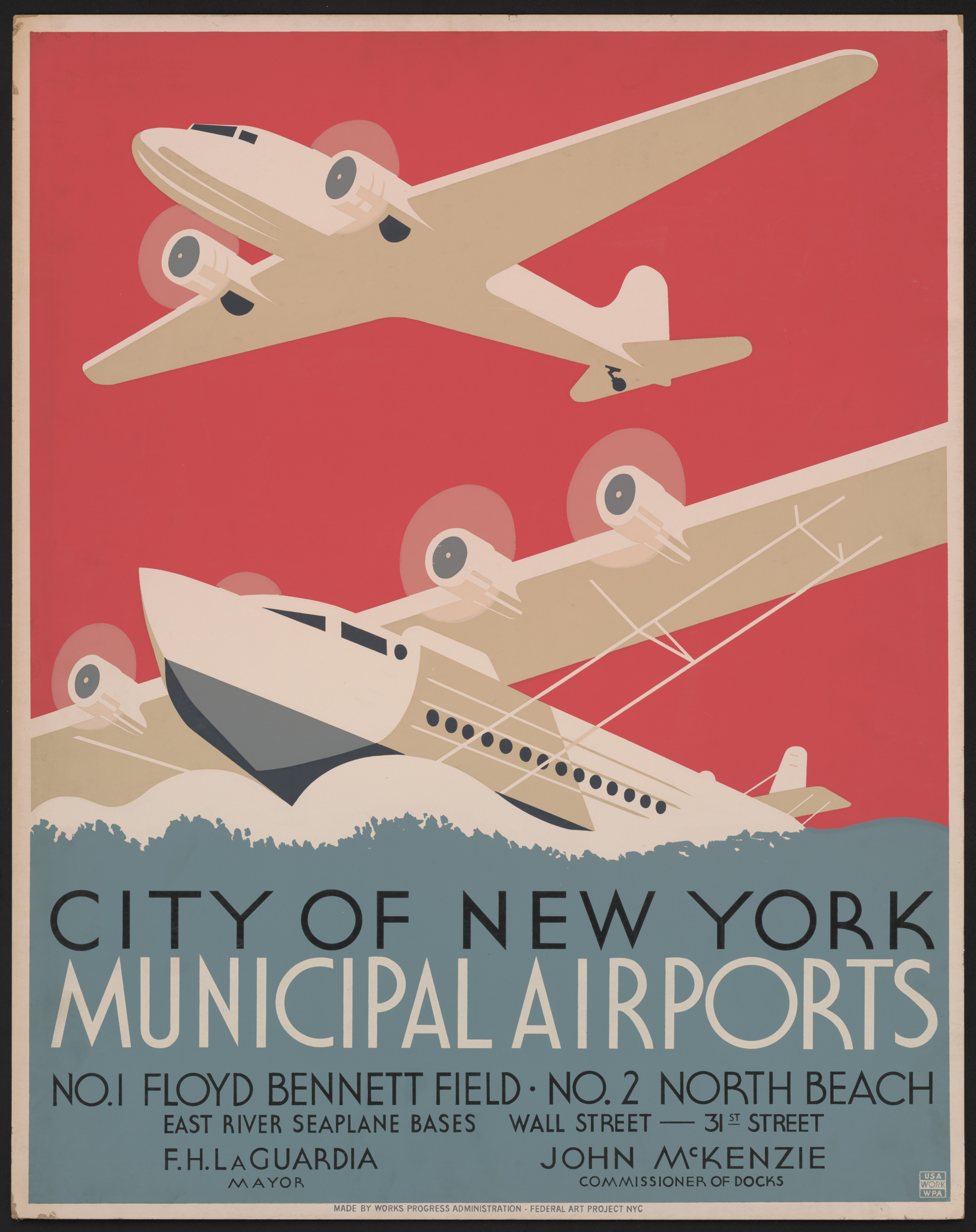
Works Progress Administration poster advertising the newly built air terminals of New York City

The 1934 election of mayor Fiorello La Guardia ushered in a new era of public investment in New York City's airports. LaGuardia had been a long-time aviation advocate; in a 1927 editorial penned while serving as a U.S. representative of New York, he criticized both the federal and state governments' slow progress in establishing municipal airports in the city. Although several potential sites had been identified, LaGuardia mainly pushed for the transformation of Governors Island into a combined airport and seaplane base. "No greater monument to the life and activity of the Republic can be imagined," he wrote, painting it as a teeming transportation hub at the extreme center of the city. Military and shipping concerns eventually shut down the proposal, but LaGuardia and industry leaders maintained consensus that New York City needed a central "express" airport to complement the farther-flung Floyd Bennett Field, which it completed in 1930.

While the Governors Island proposal was being litigated, LaGuardia also saw development potential in Curtiss Airport. Under his administration, the city entered a five-year contract with its owners, agreeing to lease the field for $1 per year, with an option to purchase the property for $1,500,000 (equivalent to $34,802,158 in 2025). The airport was officially dedicated Municipal Airport 2 on January 5, 1935. At a key ceremony that day, LaGuardia also received a signed lease from Trans World Airlines (TWA) for hangar space at Floyd Bennett Field—making it the first major US airline to serve New York City directly. While years would pass before TWA arrived at North Beach, LaGuardia had begun fulfilling one of his ultimate goals - extracting New York City from "the humiliating position of seeing all its passengers and mail traffic go to a nearby state."

=== LaGuardia Airport ===
The initiative to develop the airport for commercial flights began with an outburst by New York Mayor Fiorello La Guardia (in office from 1934 to 1945) upon the arrival of his TWA flight at Newark Airport – the only commercial airport serving the New York City region at the time – as his ticket said "New York". He demanded to be taken to New York, and ordered the plane to be flown to Brooklyn's Floyd Bennett Field, giving an impromptu press conference to reporters along the way. He urged New Yorkers to support a new airport within their city.

American Airlines accepted LaGuardia's offer to start a trial program of scheduled flights to Floyd Bennett, although the program failed after several months because Newark's airport was closer to Manhattan. La Guardia went as far as to offer police escorts to airport limousines in an attempt to get American Airlines to continue operating the trial program.

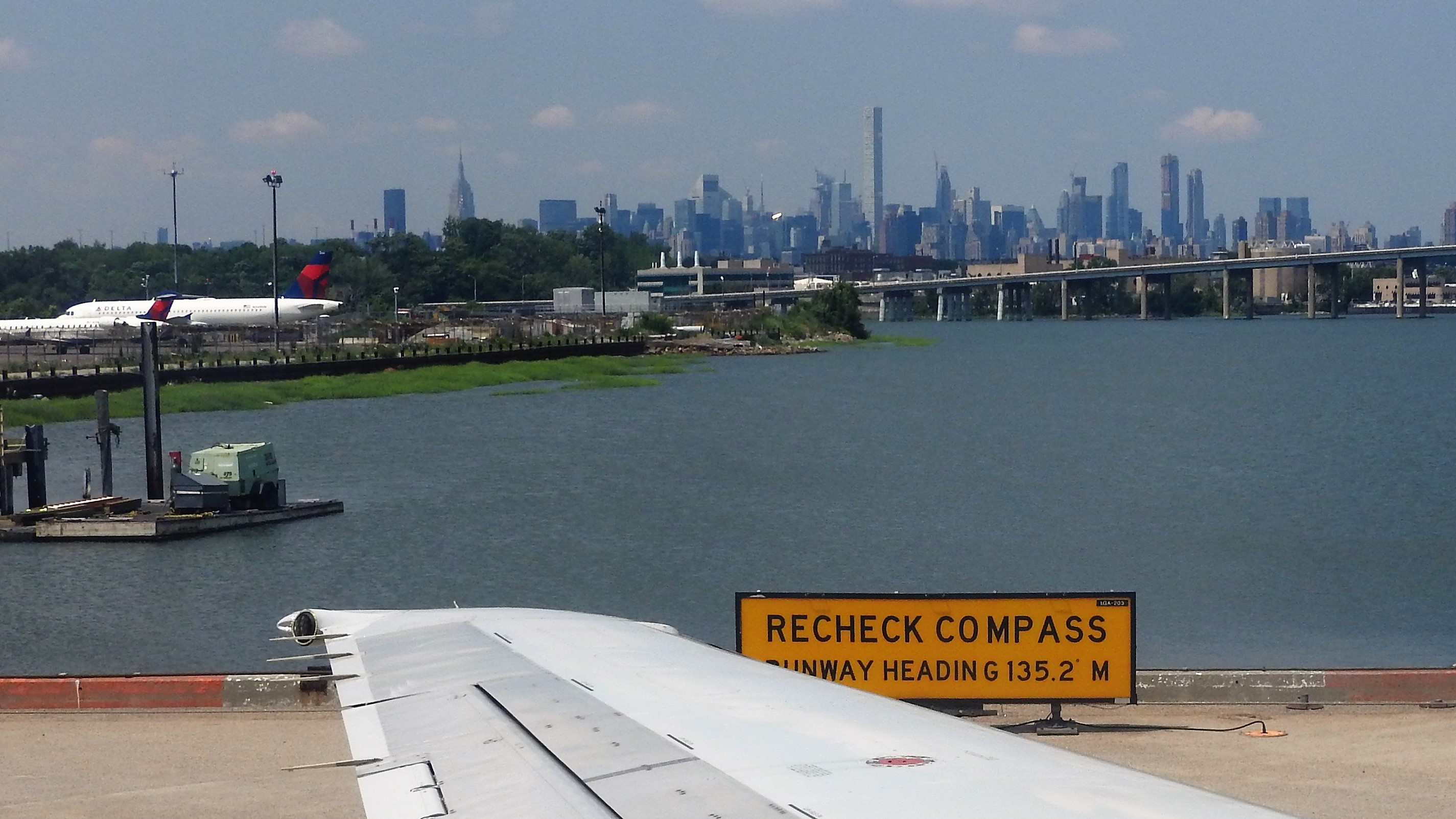
Sign at runway 13 warning pilots to check compass

During the Floyd Bennett experiment, LaGuardia and American executives began an alternative plan to build a new airport in Queens, where it could take advantage of the new Queens–Midtown Tunnel to Manhattan. The existing North Beach Airport was an obvious location, but much too small for the sort of airport that was being planned. With backing and assistance from the Works Progress Administration, construction began in 1937, it is on the waterfront of Flushing and Bowery Bays in East Elmhurst, and borders the neighborhoods of Astoria and Jackson Heights. Building on the site required moving landfill from Rikers Island, then a garbage dump, onto a metal reinforcing framework. The framework below the airport still causes magnetic interference on the compasses of outgoing aircraft; signs on the airfield warn pilots about the problem.

Because of American's pivotal role in the development of the airport, LaGuardia gave the airline extra real estate during the airport's first year of operation, including four hangars, which was an unprecedented amount of space at the time. American opened its first Admirals Club (and the first private airline club in the world) at the airport in 1939. The club took over a large office space that had previously been reserved for the mayor, but he offered it for lease following criticism from the press, and American vice president Red Mosier immediately accepted the offer.

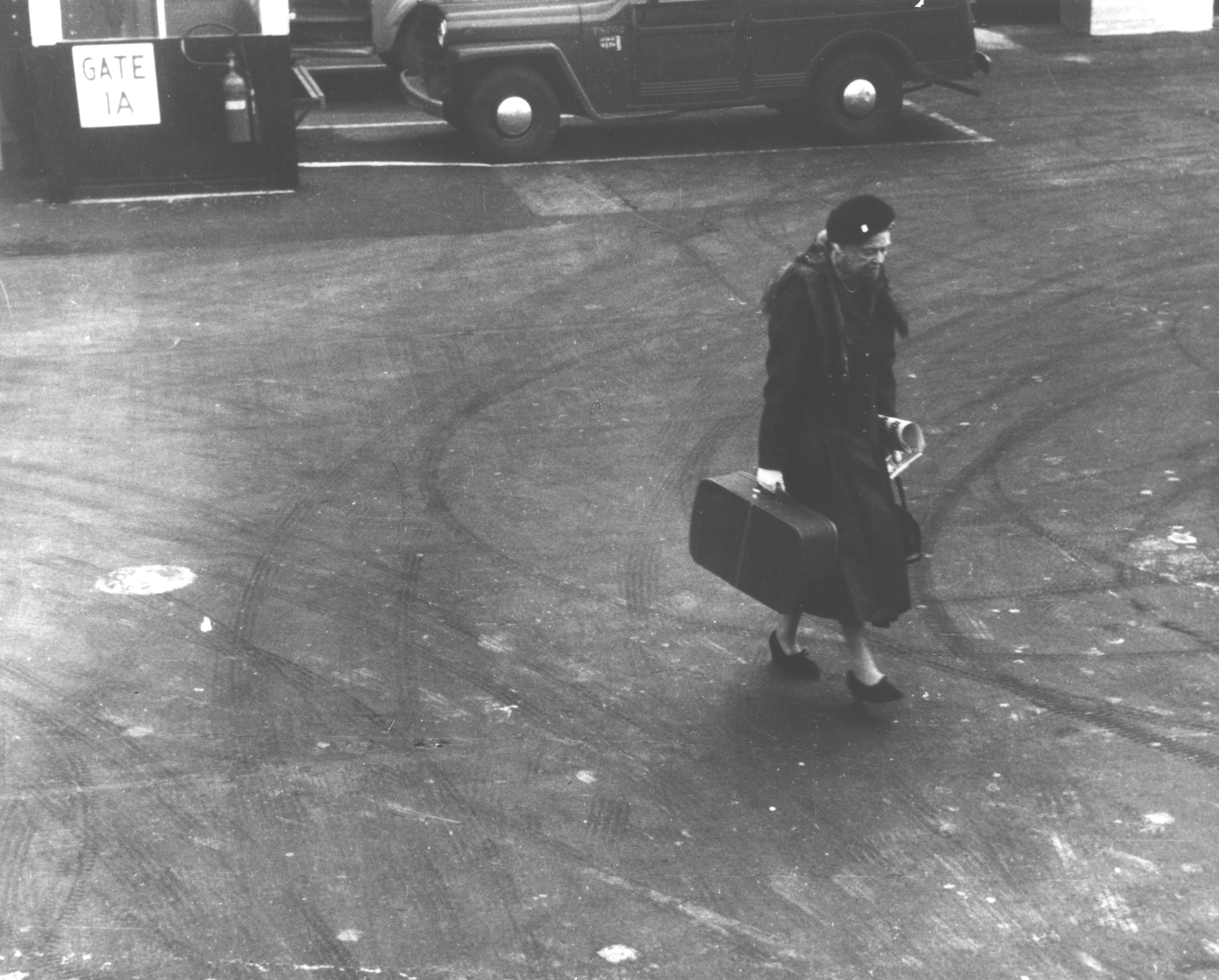
Eleanor Roosevelt at LaGuardia, 1960

The airport was dedicated on October 15, 1939, as the New York Municipal Airport, and opened for business on December 2 of that year. The modest North Beach Airport was transformed into a 550-acre (220-ha) state-of-the-art facility at a cost of $23 million to New York City. Not everyone shared La Guardia's enthusiasm for the project; some thought it was a $40 million waste of money. However, the concept of air travel itself captivated the public, and thousands of people went to the airport to see the planes take off and land in exchange for a dime. After two years, these fees and the parking they generated had already brought in $285,000. In addition, a total of $650,000 was made annually from non-travel-related sources such as restaurants. The airport was soon a financial success. A smaller airport in nearby Jackson Heights, Holmes Airport, was unable to prevent the expansion of the larger airport, and closed in 1940.

Newark Airport began renovations, but could not keep up with the new Queens airport, which TIME called "the most pretentious land and seaplane base in the world". Even before the project was completed, LaGuardia had won commitments from the five largest airlines (Pan American Airways, American, United, Eastern Air Lines, and Transcontinental and Western Air) to begin using the new field as soon as it opened. Pan Am's transatlantic Boeing 314 flying boats moved to La Guardia from Port Washington in 1940. During World War II, the airport was used to train aviation technicians and as a logistics field. Transatlantic landplane airline flights started in late 1945; some continued after Idlewild (now John F. Kennedy International) opened in July 1948, but the last ones shifted to Idlewild in April 1951.

Newspaper accounts alternately referred to the airfield as New York Municipal Airport and LaGuardia Field until the modern name was officially applied when the airport moved to Port of New York Authority control under a lease with New York City on June 1, 1947.

LaGuardia opened with four runways at 45°-degree angles to each other, the longest (13/31) being 6,000 ft (1,800 m). Runway 18/36 was closed soon after a United DC-4 ran off the south end in 1947; runway 9/27 (4,500 ft) was closed around 1958, allowing LaGuardia's terminal to expand northward after 1960. Around 1961, runway 13/31 was shifted northeastward to allow construction of a parallel taxiway (such amenities being unknown when LGA was built), and in 1965–66, both remaining runways were extended to their present 7,000 ft (2,100 m).

The April 1957 Official Airline Guide shows 283 weekday fixed-wing departures from LaGuardia: 126 American, 49 Eastern, 33 Northeast, 31 TWA, 29 Capital, and 15 United. American's flights included 26 nonstops to Boston and 27 to Washington National (mostly Convair 240s). Jet flights (United 727s to Cleveland and Chicago) started on June 1, 1964.

In 1975 a bomb detonated at the airport's baggage claim area, killing 11 people and injuring 74. The culprit was never determined.

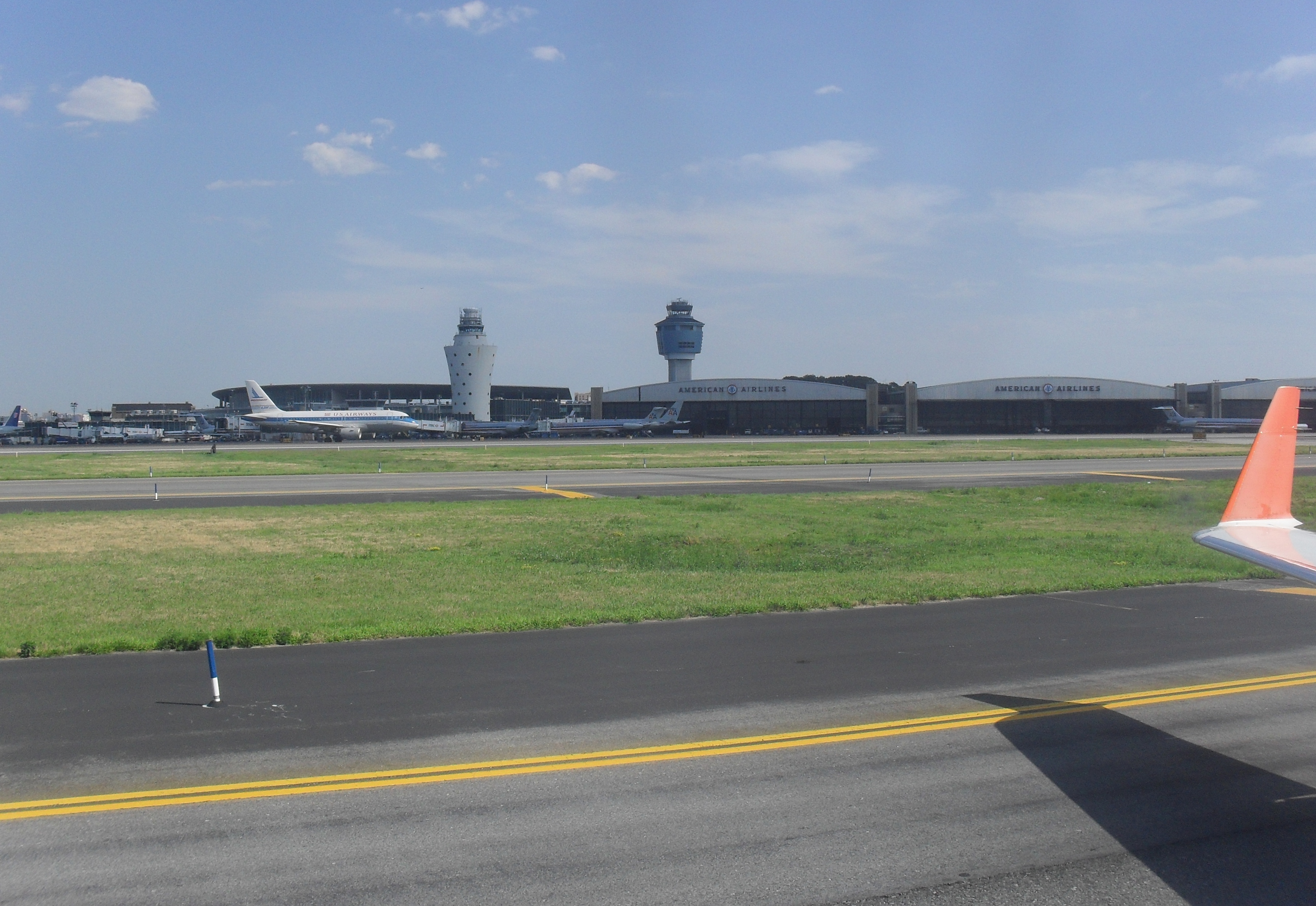
LaGuardia Airport as seen from a taxiway in 2010: Note both the new and old control towers.

Although LaGuardia was a large airport for the era in which it was built, it soon became too small. Starting in 1968, general-aviation aircraft were charged heavy fees to operate from LaGuardia during peak hours, driving many LGA operators to airports such as Teterboro Airport in Teterboro, New Jersey. The increase in traffic at LaGuardia and safety concerns prompted the closure of nearby Flushing Airport in 1984. Also in 1984, to further combat overcrowding at LGA, the Port Authority instituted a Sunday-thru-Friday "perimeter rule" banning nonstop flights from LaGuardia to cities more than 1,500 mi (2,400 km) away; at the time, Denver was the only such city with nonstop flights, and it became the only exception to the rule. (In 1986, Western Airlines hoped to fly 737-300s nonstop to Salt Lake City, and unsuccessfully challenged the rule in federal court.) Later, the Port Authority also moved to connect JFK and Newark Airport to regional rail networks with the AirTrain Newark and AirTrain JFK, in an attempt to make these more distant airports competitive with LaGuardia. In addition to these local regulations, the Federal Aviation Administration also limited the number of flights and types of aircraft that could operate at LaGuardia.

LaGuardia's traffic continued to grow. By 2000, the airport routinely experienced overcrowding delays, many more than an hour long. That year, Congress passed legislation to revoke the federal traffic limits on LaGuardia by 2007. The reduced demand for air travel following the September 11, 2001, terrorist attacks on New York City quickly slowed LaGuardia's traffic growth, helping to mitigate the airport's delays. Ongoing Port Authority investments to renovate the Central Terminal Building and improve the airfield layout have also made the airport's operations more efficient in recent years.

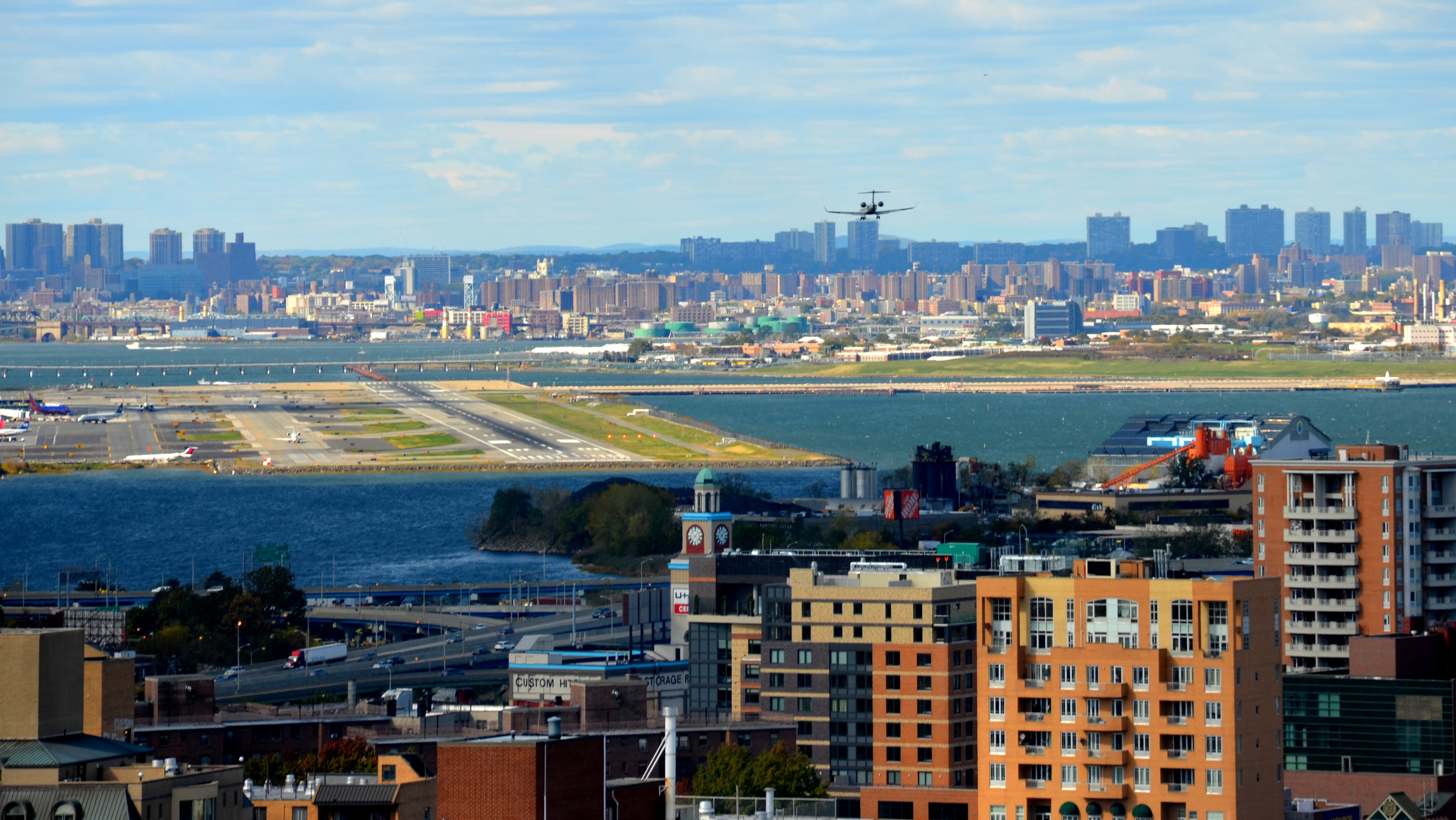
Aircraft on final approach to LGA runway 31 over Flushing, Queens

The FAA approved instrument departure procedure "Whitestone Climb" and the "Expressway Visual Approach to Runway 31". When adopting the Expressway Approach, when the aircraft crosses the intersection of the Brooklyn Queens Expressway and the Long Island Expressway in Long Island City, it turns northeast on 85° and follows the Long Island Expressway, after reaching Flushing Meadow Park, the aircraft executes a 135° left turn over the Flushing Bay and joins the final approach to the runway 31. When adopting Whitestone Climb, aircraft circle over Flushing and head to Whitestone Bridge on the north upon takeoff from runway 13. Such patterns aim to reduce the noise, avoid the traffic of the JFK Airport, and maximize the air-traffic capacity in the New York TRACON. LGA and JFK approach airspaces borders around the Belmont Park.

In late 2006, construction began to replace the Wallace Harrison-designed air traffic control tower built in 1962 with a more modern one. The tower began operations on October 9, 2010. A replica of the 1962 control tower was installed in a decorative garden at the airport in 2025, to preserve the memory of its unique design.

On August 12, 2009, Delta Air Lines and US Airways announced a landing slot and terminal swap in separate press releases. Under the swap plan, US Airways would have given Delta 125 operating slot pairs at LaGuardia. US Airways, in return, would have received 42 operating slot pairs at Ronald Reagan Washington National Airport in Crystal City, Virginia, and be granted the authority to begin service from the US to São Paulo, Brazil, and Tokyo, Japan. When the swap plan was complete, Delta Shuttle operations would have moved from the Marine Air Terminal to Terminal C (the present US Airways terminal), and Terminals C and D would have been connected together. US Airways Shuttle flights would have moved to the Marine Air Terminal, and mainline US Airways flights would have moved to Terminal D (the present Delta terminal). The deal would allow Delta to create a domestic hub at LaGuardia.

The United States Department of Transportation announced that it would approve the Delta–US Airways transaction under the condition that they sell slots to other airlines. Delta and US Airways dropped the slot swap deal in early July 2010, and both airlines filed a court appeal. In May 2011, both airlines announced that they would resubmit their proposal of the slot swap to the US DOT. It was tentatively approved by the US DOT on July 21, 2011. The slot swap received final approval from the US DOT on October 10, 2011.

On December 16, 2011, Delta Air Lines announced plans to open a new domestic hub at LaGuardia Airport. The investment was the largest single expansion by any carrier at LaGuardia in decades, with flights increasing by more than 60%, and destinations by more than 75%. By summer 2013, Delta increased operations to 264 daily flights between LaGuardia and more than 60 cities, more than any other airline at LaGuardia.

In November 2019, Southwest Airlines ended service to Newark, primarily due to the Boeing 737 MAX groundings, poor performance, and inadequate facilities, and consolidated its New York–area operations to LaGuardia and Islip.

==== Redevelopment ====
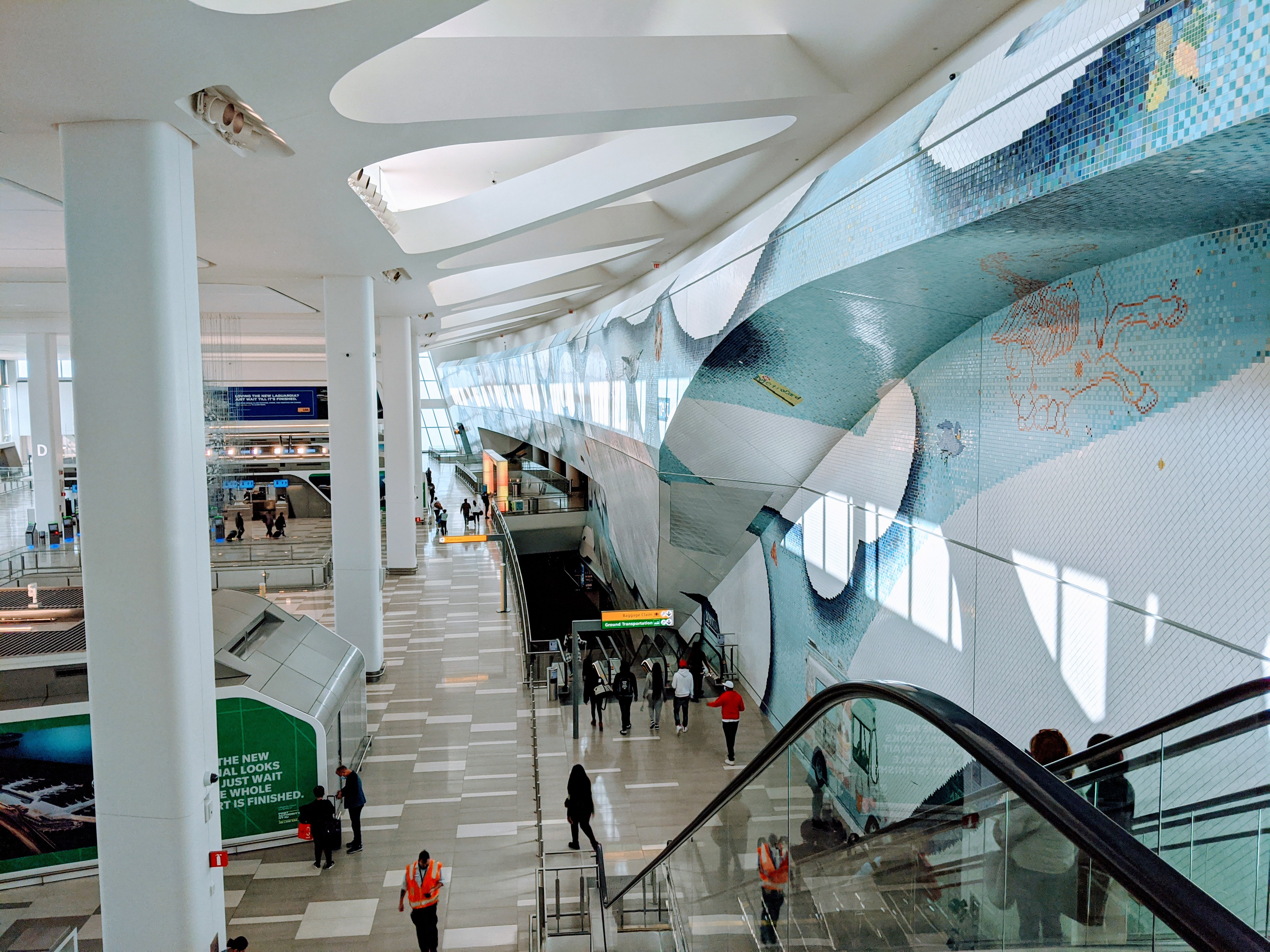
The reconstructed Terminal B at LaGuardia in 2020

In April 2010, Port Authority director Christopher Ward announced that the agency had hired consultants to explore a full demolition and rebuilding of LaGuardia's Central Terminal. The project would create a unified, modern, and efficient plan for the airport, currently an amalgam of decades of additions and modifications. The project, expected to cost $2.4 billion, was to include the demolition of the existing central terminal building and its four concourses, garage, hangar 1, and frontage roads; building temporary facilities, and designing and building a new central terminal building. The rebuilding would be staged in phases in order to maintain operations throughout the project.

Proposals were due on January 31, 2012. Patrick Foye, executive director of the Port Authority, said, "It's got a quaint, nostalgic but unacceptable kind of the 1940s, 1950s feel that's just not acceptable." The Port Authority was seeking a private company to develop and operate the replacement terminal with private funds, similar to how Delta operates the other terminals at the airport. However, in January 2014, Governor Andrew Cuomo announced a plan for the state to oversee the construction of the long-stalled new terminal project instead of the proposed public-private partnership.

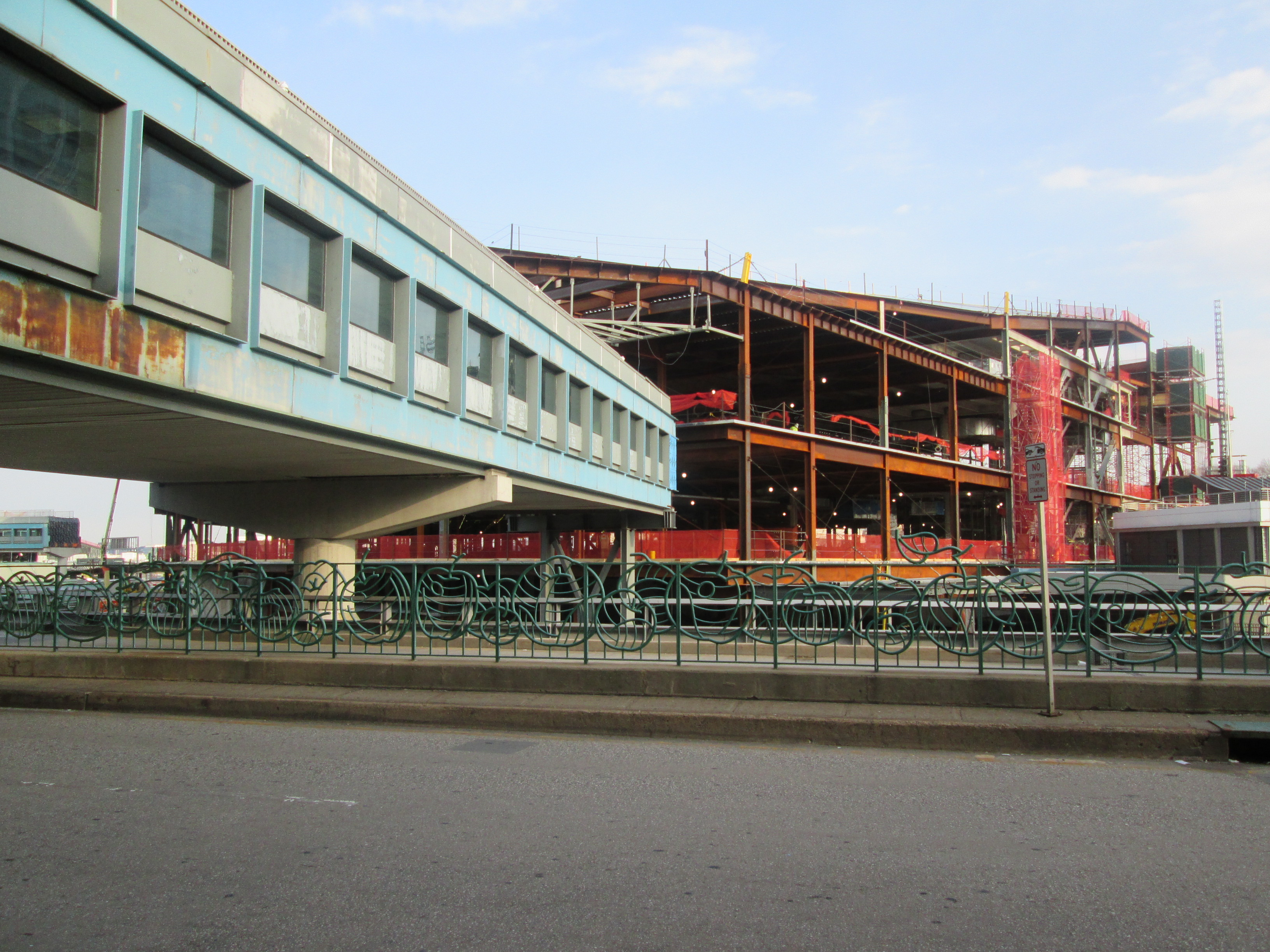
Construction at Terminal B, seen in April 2018

On July 27, 2015, Governor Cuomo, joined by then-Vice President Joe Biden, announced a $4 billion plan to rebuild the terminals as one contiguous building with terminal bridges connecting buildings. Airport officials and planners had concluded that the airport essentially had to be torn down and rebuilt.

Under the airport redevelopment plan disclosed in 2015, a single terminal building was to be constructed in stages, with a people mover, retail space, and a new hotel. Some 2 mi (3.2 km) of additional taxiways were to be built, and the Grand Central Parkway was to be reconfigured. A proposed high-speed ferry, if introduced, was to service the Marine Air Terminal, a national historic landmark, which will remain intact. An onsite tram had also been proposed to move passengers more quickly within the central terminal. The new airport is to be eco-friendly and contain accommodations such as a hotel of approximately 200 rooms and a business/conference center. The entire airport will move 600 ft (180 m) closer to the Grand Central Parkway. New parking garages replaced parking facilities between the existing terminals and Grand Central Parkway, creating space for the new facilities. By locating the terminals closer to the Grand Central Parkway, additional space for aircraft taxiways and hold areas was created, reducing ground delays. The runways themselves were not reconfigured.

Construction of the project's first phase started in spring of 2016, once final plans were approved by the Port Authority board, with the entire redevelopment scheduled to be completed by late 2022. Terminal B would be demolished, and Delta would rebuild its terminals C and D in coordination with the plan. The new airport was to feature an island gate system, with passengers connecting between the terminal building and the gates via bridges that would be high enough for aircraft to taxi under. In late March 2016, the comprehensive plans for the redevelopment were approved unanimously between the Port Authority of New York, New Jersey, and LaGuardia Gateway Partners for the Terminal B Project. Construction costs were estimated to range from $4 billion to $5.3 billion. In August 2017, Magic Johnson Enterprises and Loop Capital created a joint venture named JLC Capital to invest in Phase 2 of LaGuardia Airport's reconstruction. The same month, Delta broke ground on the last phase of the airport's reconstruction. On December 9, 2017, six airlines moved at LGA in anticipation of the new terminals. Alaska Airlines (originally Virgin America) and JetBlue moved to the Marine Air Terminal. American consolidated in Terminal B. Frontier and Spirit depart from Terminal C and arrive at Terminal D. Since the move, there have been further changes with Alaska Airlines ending service to LaGuardia, JetBlue moving to Terminal B, and Spirit consolidating its operations in Terminal A.

LaGuardia Gateway Partners, which manages the construction of Terminal B, has completed most of the complex. The first half of the seven-level West Parking Garage opened in February 2018, with 1,600 of 3,100 parking spaces being made available, and the rest of the garage was opened later that year. Eleven new gates at Terminal B opened on December 1, 2018, and were used by Air Canada, American Airlines, and Southwest Airlines. Five additional gates opened on June 2, 2019, when United relocated most of its operations to the new concourse. The new space included a concourse with a 55 ft-tall (17 m) ceiling, food concessions, an FAO Schwarz toy store, and an indoor play area. The new headhouse at Terminal B opened on June 13, 2020, along with the new connector to the Eastern Concourse. On August 5, 2020, American opened the first seven gates of the Western Concourse, with ten additional gates and the bridge connector scheduled to open at the end of 2021. The second bridge connecting to Terminal B was later completed and opened to the public on January 27, 2022.

On the east side of the airport, Delta is consolidating its Terminals C and D, into a centralized Terminal C headhouse, which is located on the former Terminal D parking site. In addition, Delta is rebuilding its airside facilities into four "finger" concourses. The first concourse to open was Concourse G on the eastern end of the airport, which opened on October 29, 2019. Delta Shuttle flights moved to the Concourse G on November 16, 2019. On June 4, 2022, Delta unveiled its new Terminal C headhouse to the public in tandem with concourse E, which boasts 10 narrow body gates. The Terminal C headhouse consolidates the former Terminal C and D's security checkpoint into 11 lanes, which if necessary, can be expanded to 16 lanes. Other features include a dedicated drop-off area for carry-on-only passengers, biometric scanning technology, a sensory room designed for those with autism, and Delta's largest Sky Club to date.

As of June 2022, Delta was in the process of replacing Terminal D's gates and would start construction of Concourse D. Delta is fast-tracking its remaining projects at Terminal C due to the impacts from the COVID-19 pandemic, which allowed the airline to use the decrease in passage traffic to speed up construction by two years.

In March 2024, LaGuardia won the Airport Service Quality Award for "best airport of 25 to 40 million passengers in North America" in 2023.

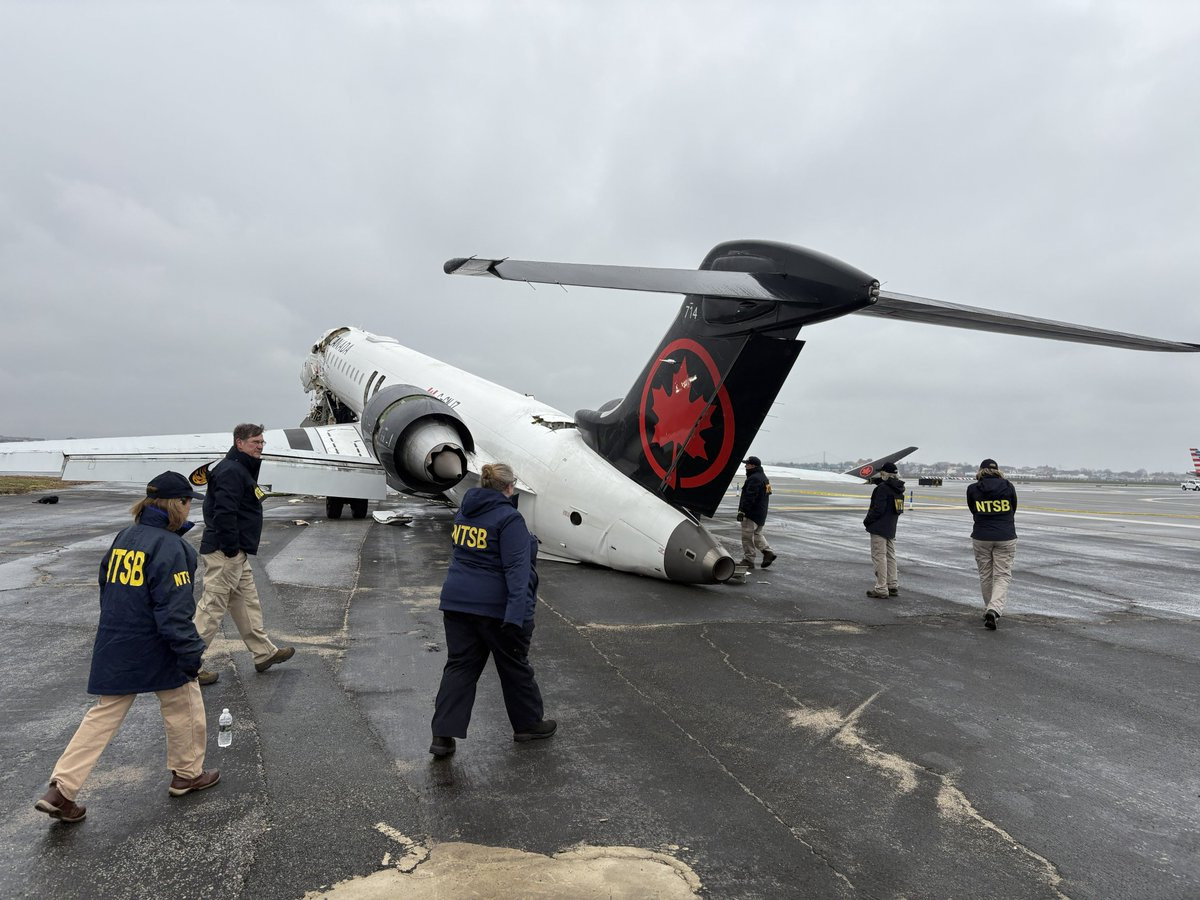
The NTSB investigating the aftermath of the collision, March 23, 2026

On March 22, 2026, Air Canada Express Flight 8646 collided with a firetruck at Runway 4/22. Both pilots died and 42 passengers were injured. A flight attendant had also been ejected from her seat while still buckled in. By March 23, the airport was closed off while agents were investigating and probing the incident, and 72 out of the passengers, about 4 crew members boarded, and 41 people were hospitalizated. The airport remained closed for most of March 23 until progressively reopening later that day.

At 3:00 am ET on May 2, 2026, Spirit Airlines ceased operations following its Chapter 7 bankruptcy filing. The airline’s last ever take-off from LaGuardia was NK1443 to Charlotte at 9:51 pm ET on May 1, 2026, while its last ever landing was NK1629 from Detroit at 11:08 pm ET that same day.

== Operations ==
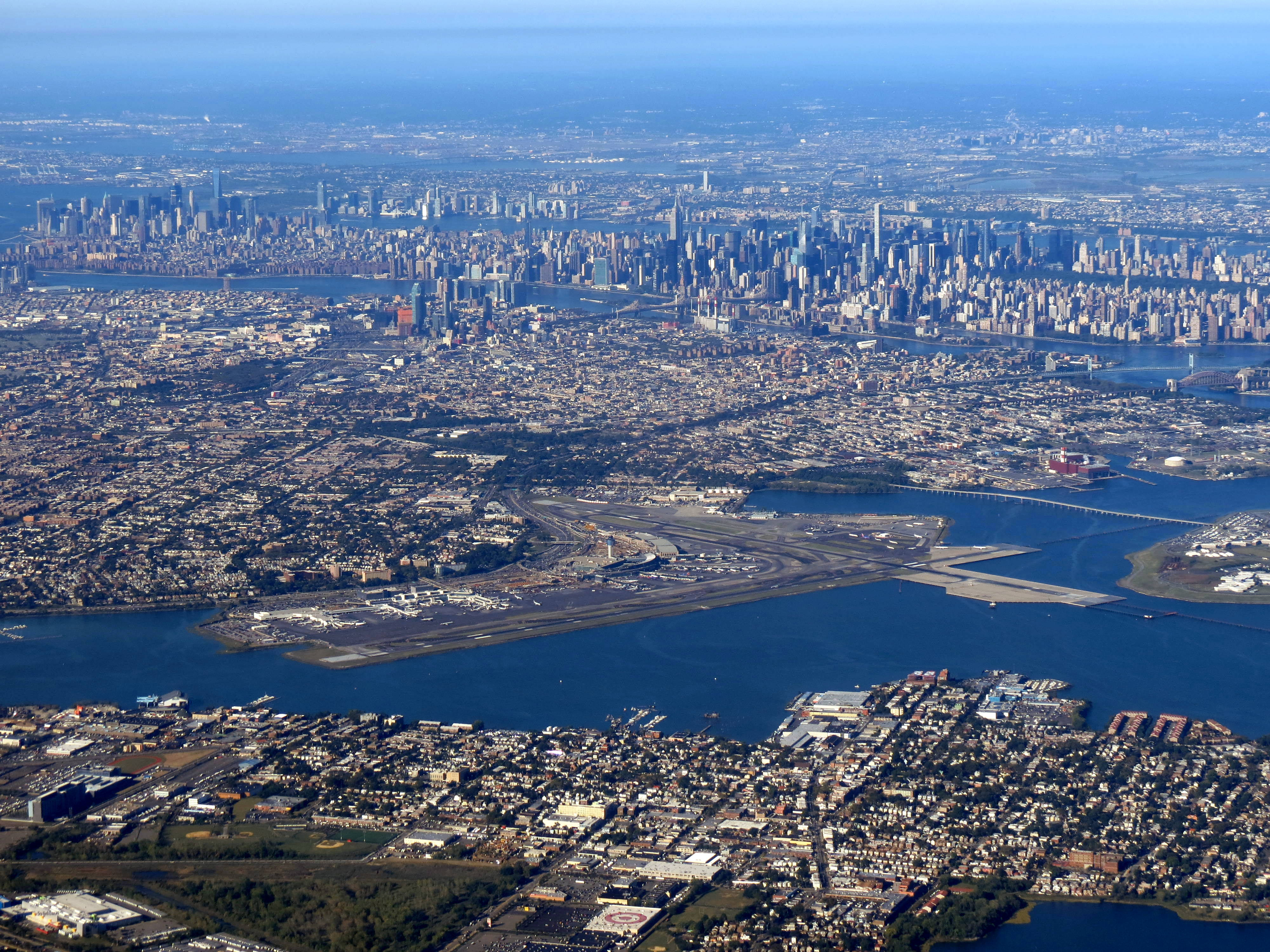
Aerial view of LaGuardia with Manhattan in the background, 2016

While LaGuardia frequently accommodates general aviation, the airport is primarily serviced by Part 121 scheduled air carriers providing passenger service to regional, domestic, and limited international destinations. Because of its congested nature and proximity to dense urban neighborhoods, commercial flights to and from the airport are subject to several restrictions enacted by both the FAA and the PANYNJ. The airport almost only ever handles narrow-body aircraft, though it can handle Airplane Design Group IV widebody aircraft such as the Boeing 767 and the Airbus A310, but aircraft in this group are rarely seen at LaGuardia.

=== Law enforcement ===
Law enforcement at LaGuardia Airport is the responsibility primarily of the Port Authority of New York and New Jersey Police Department. In addition to normal uniformed patrol of terminals, concourses, and parking lots, the PAPD provides anti-crime plainclothes units, criminal investigative detective squads, counter-terrorism units, high-value cargo escorts and patrols, dignitary protection, marine patrol of surrounding waters, passenger screening point protection and security, Aircraft Rescue Fire Fighting and community outreach. The PAPD operates alongside partner agencies, including the Transportation Security Administration (TSA) and the New York Police Department.

=== Service restrictions ===
==== International flights ====
LaGuardia, unlike JFK and Newark, does not have U.S. Customs and Border Protection (CBP) facilities. As such, international arrivals are only possible from airports serviced by United States border preclearance. Passengers and crewmembers on these flights clear immigration and customs inspections at their departure airport, and then for such purposes are considered to be within US territory during their entire journey. Upon arrival, they may immediately exit LaGuardia or transfer to domestic flights in the same manner as domestic travelers.

==== Curfew and perimeter rule ====
To mitigate the impact of aircraft noise pollution and facilitate airfield maintenance, a seasonal curfew traditionally exists between the hours of 12 am and 6 am during the warm months of the year. Additionally, a 1984 "perimeter rule" implemented by PANYNJ bars airline flights to and from points farther than 1,500 mi (2,400 km), except on Saturdays or to Denver, Colorado. Transcontinental (coast-to-coast) flights use JFK and Newark. With long-haul operations generally requiring heavier fuel loads and larger aircraft, the regulation aims to eliminate excess perceived noise generated by such flights. Changes to the perimeter rule were considered as recently as 2015, but a New York State Senate bill, which failed, was introduced in 2021 with the intent of codifying the rule into law.

==== Slot system ====
As one of the United States' most-dense and congested class B airports, LaGuardia's IFR operations are governed by an FAA slot system. Operators are granted time-sensitive individual takeoff and landing rights in accordance with the International Air Transport Association's Worldwide Airport Slot Guidelines. In 2020, the FAA responded to drastic reductions in air traffic caused by the COVID-19 pandemic by suspending the expiration of unused slots at several US airports, including LaGuardia.

== Facilities ==
=== Terminals ===
LaGuardia has three active terminals (A, B, and C) with 72 gates. The terminals are all connected by buses and walkways. Signage throughout the terminals was designed by Paul Mijksenaar. As with the other Port Authority airports, some terminals at LaGuardia are managed and maintained by airlines themselves. Terminal B was under direct Port Authority operation, but in 2016, operation of Terminal B was transferred to a private company, LaGuardia Gateway Partners.

LaGuardia has undergone a multibillion-dollar redesign that resulted in a new Terminal B and a new Terminal C (encompassing the old Terminals C and D). Terminal A remains unchanged except for minor updates. The new layout consists of new gates and concourses: Terminal B has two gate concourses referred to as the Western Concourse (Gates 11–31) and Eastern Concourse (Gates 40–59); Terminal C has four gate concourses (numbered 61–69, 71–79, 82–89, and 92–98).

==== Terminal A ====
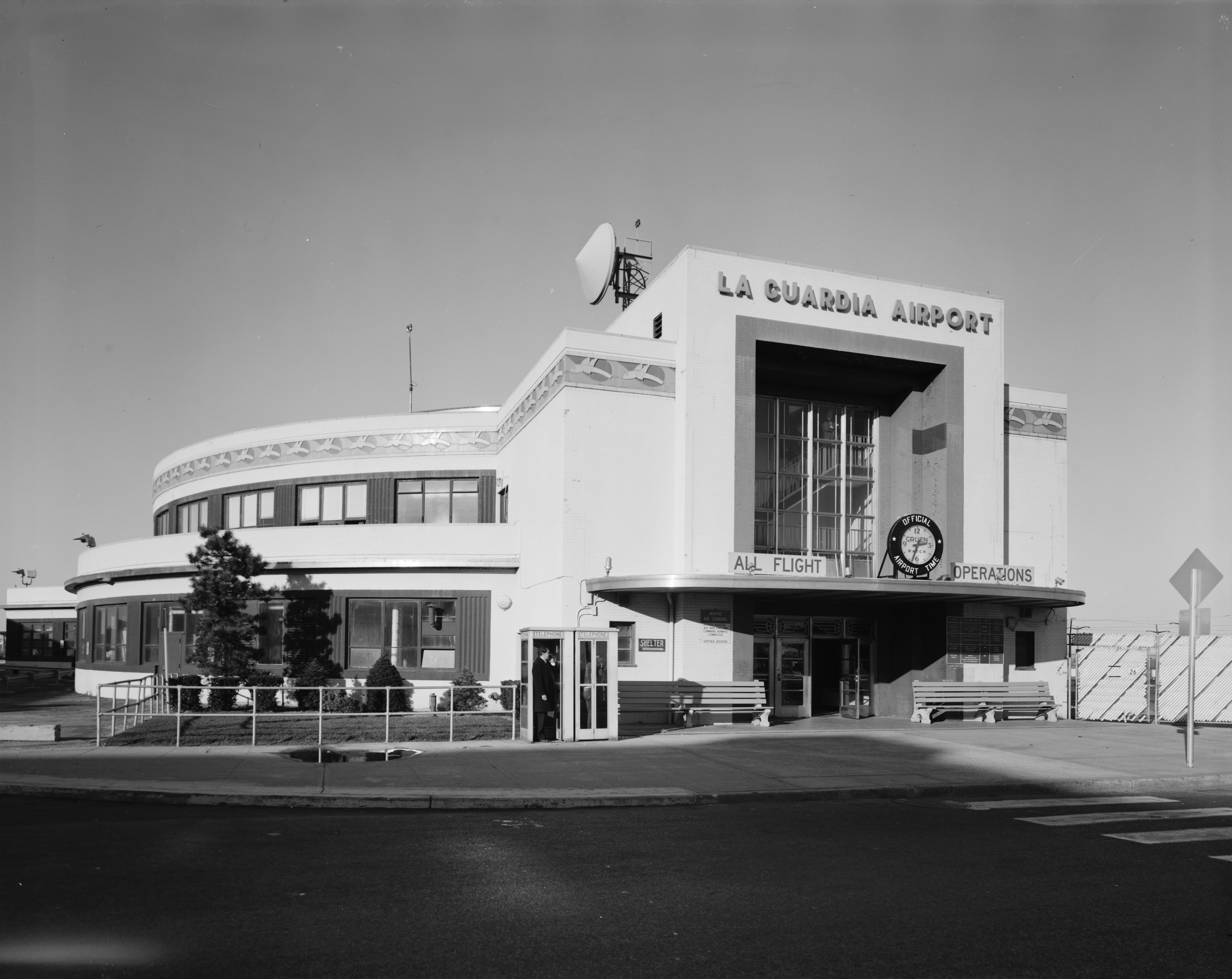
Marine Air Terminal in 1974

Terminal A, known as the Marine Air Terminal (MAT), was the airport's original terminal for overseas flights. The waterfront terminal was designed to serve the fleet of flying boats, or Clippers, of Pan American Airways, America's main international airline throughout the 1930s and 1940s. When a Clipper landed in Long Island Sound, it taxied to a dock where passengers could disembark into the terminal. During World War II, new four-engine land planes were developed, and flying boats stopped carrying scheduled passengers out of New York after 1947. The last Pan American flight left the terminal in February 1952, bound for Bermuda.

Inside the terminal hangs Flight, a mural measuring 12 ft (3.7 m) in height and 237 ft (72 m) in length; it was the largest mural created as part of the Great Depression–era Works Progress Administration (WPA). Completed by James Brooks in 1942, Flight depicts the history of humanity's involvement with flight. The mural was painted over without explanation by the Port Authority of New York and New Jersey in the 1950s, possibly because some saw left-wing symbolism in it. After an extensive restoration project headed by aviation historian Geoffrey Arend, the mural was rededicated in 1980.

In 1986, Pan Am restarted flights at the MAT with the purchase of New York Air's shuttle service between Boston, New York City, and Washington, D.C. In 1991, Delta Air Lines bought the Pan Am Shuttle and subsequently started service from the MAT on September 1. In 1995, the MAT was designated as a historic landmark. A $7 million restoration was completed in time for the airport's 65th anniversary of commercial flights on December 2, 2004. On December 9, 2017, JetBlue and Alaska Airlines relocated to the MAT, while Delta consolidated all Delta Shuttle flights to Terminal C. On October 27, 2018, Alaska Airlines ended all service from LaGuardia Airport, leaving JetBlue as the terminal's only tenant. On April 28, 2021, Spirit Airlines started operating its Fort Lauderdale–bound flights from Terminal A. On July 20, 2021, JetBlue announced that they will be relocating from the MAT to Terminal B, a move they completed on July 9, 2022, with the relocation of Boston flights to Terminal B. On March 29, 2022, all flights operated by Spirit Airlines began operating out of the MAT. On September 13 of that year, Frontier Airlines moved all of its flights to Terminal A, before moving all flights to Terminal B on April 10, 2024. Upon Spirit's bankruptcy on May 2, 2026, the terminal was left vacant.

==== Terminal B ====
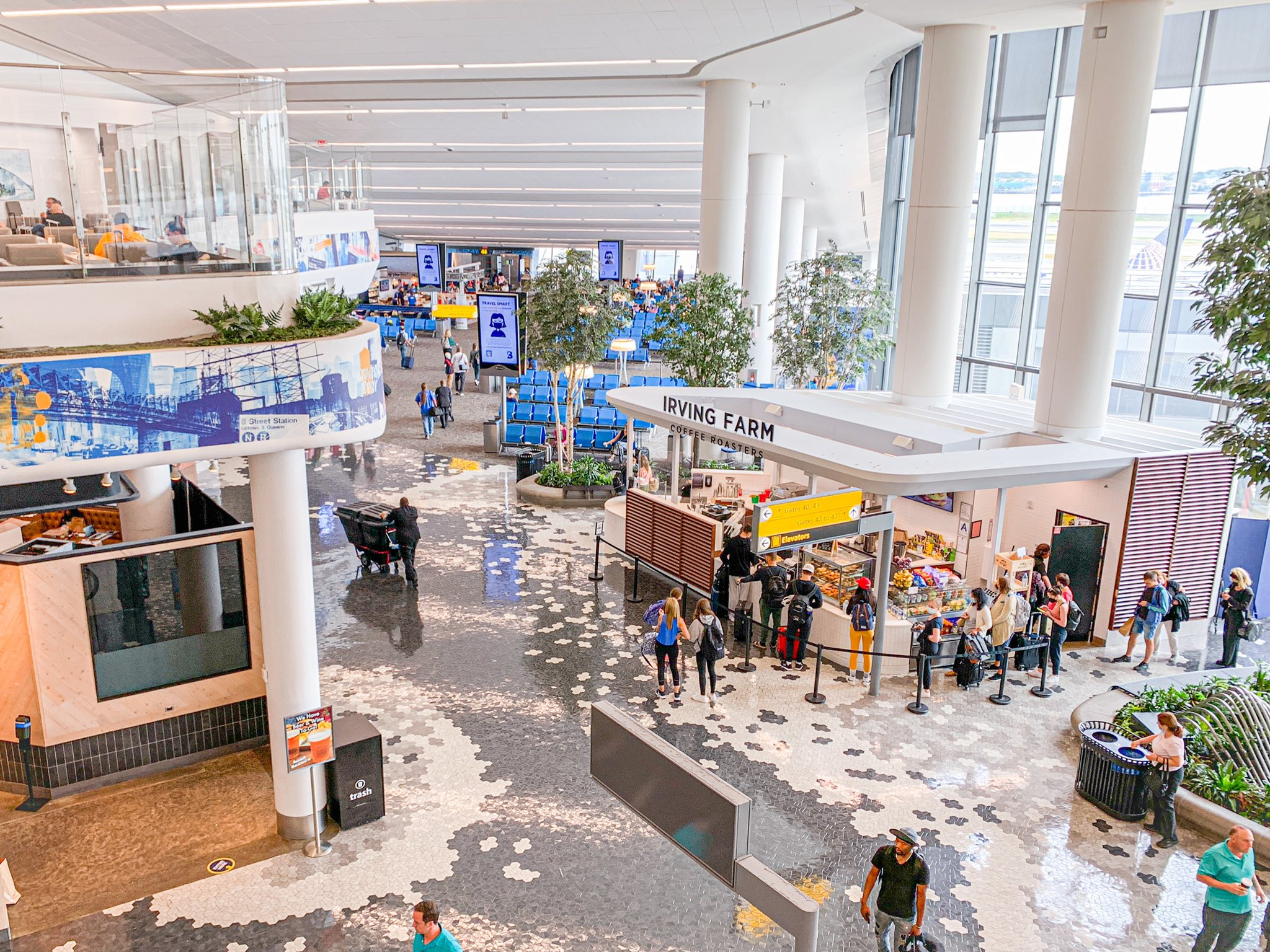
Terminal B in 2022

Terminal B serves all airlines except for Delta, and it functions as a large hub for American Airlines. In 2017, work started on the first of two new concourses, which replaced the old A, B, C, and D concourses. The new terminal was designed by Hellmuth, Obata + Kassabaum.

In 2020, the new Terminal B headhouse opened with a bridge connecting it to the completed Eastern Concourse. On January 27, 2022, a second bridge was completed, connecting Terminal B's headhouse to the Western Concourse. In 2022, the old Terminal B was demolished.

On October 31, 2021, JetBlue moved to Terminal B (except for flights to Boston), as the airline wanted to make connections easier with American Airlines due to the "Northeast Alliance" between them. JetBlue's Boston flights moved to Terminal B on July 9, 2022.

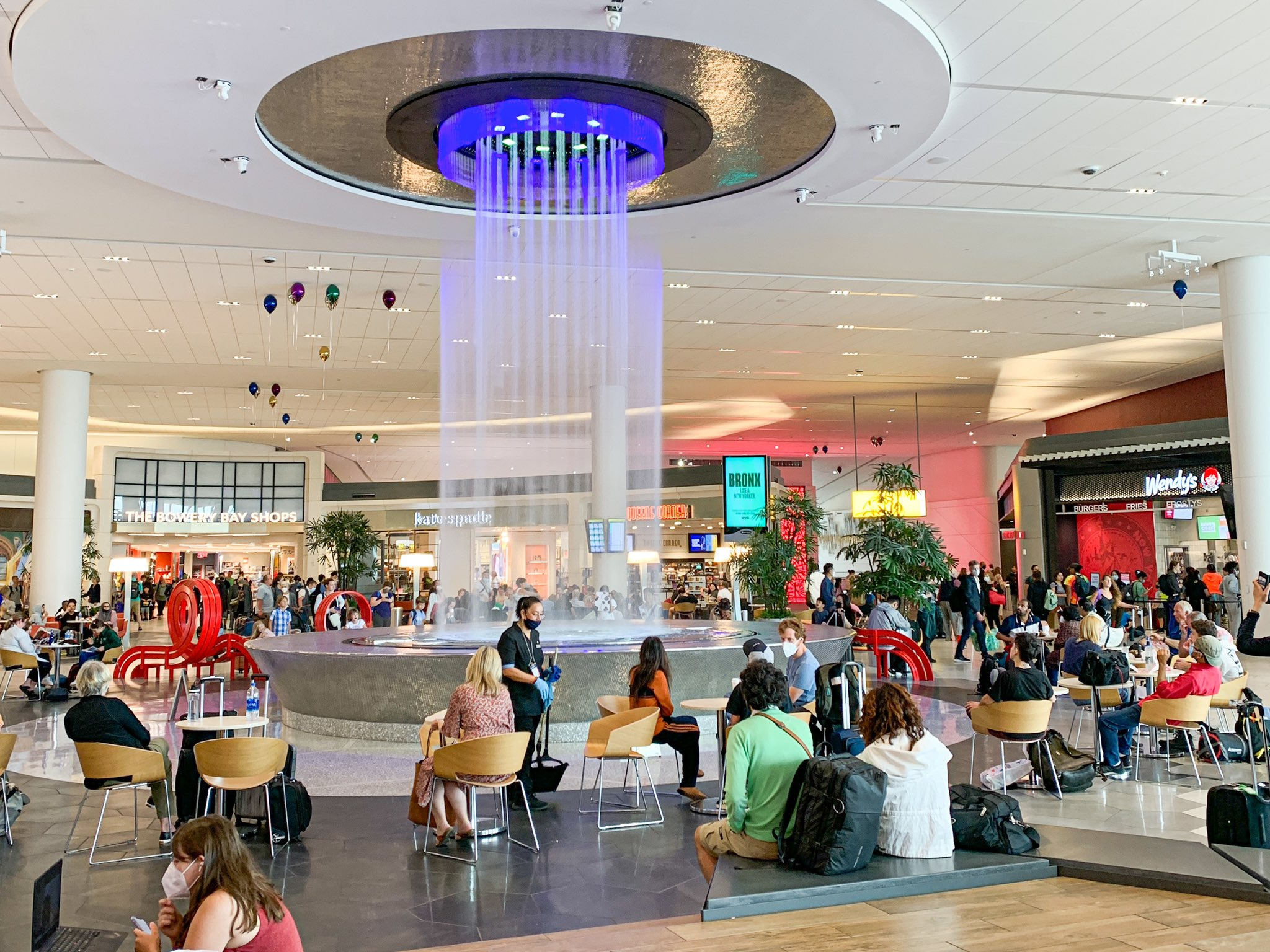
A fountain at Terminal B

Headhouse floorplans
4F		Bridges to/from concourses
3F	Departures	Passenger drop-off, ticketing and check-in, security, parking
2F	Arrivals	Baggage claim, car services, parking, passenger pick-up, taxis
1F	Public transit	Welcome center, hotel shuttles and buses

Western Concourse (Gates 11–31)
Airlines that operate out of the Western Concourse include:

- American Airlines / American Eagle

Eastern Concourse (Gates 40–59)
On December 1, 2018, eleven gates at Terminal B's new Eastern Concourse opened. Five additional gates opened on June 2, 2019, allowing United Airlines to move all of its operations at LaGuardia to the new concourse. Airlines operating out of the Eastern Concourse include:

- Air Canada / Air Canada Express
- Frontier Airlines
- JetBlue
- Porter Airlines
- Southwest Airlines
- United Airlines / United Express

==== Terminal C ====
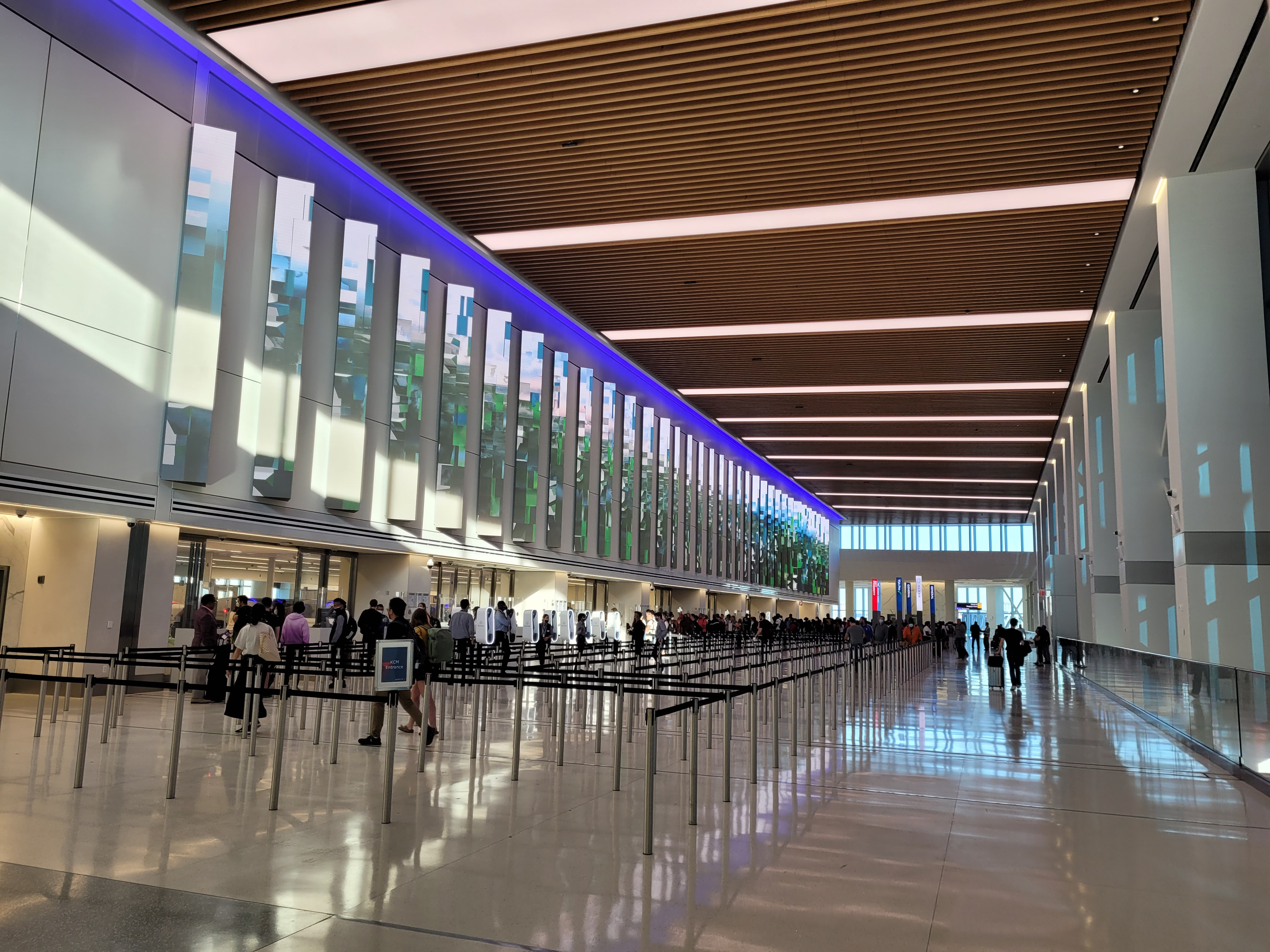
LGA Terminal C Security Checkpoint as of June 6, 2022

The new Terminal C, designed by Corgan, opened on June 4, 2022, and connects to four concourses serving Delta Air Lines and Delta Connection flights. Three of these concourses are new (E, F and G) and one (D) is part of the original Terminal C and was refurbished while maintaining much of the structure. When completed, the new Terminal C will include access to 37 gates in its four concourses. The new Terminal C also has a Delta Sky Club, the airline's largest.

=== Former terminals ===
==== Central Terminal Building ====
The Central Terminal Building (CTB) was originally six blocks long, and consisted of a four-story central section, two three-story wings, and four concourses (A, B, C, and D) with 40 aircraft gates. The $36 million facilities designed by Harrison and Abramovitz was dedicated on April 17, 1964. Delta and US Airways left the CTB in 1983 and 1992 respectively for their own dedicated terminals on the east side of the airport. The Port Authority and various airlines carried out a $340 million improvement project in the 1990s to expand and renovate the existing space. The terminal was replaced by the new Terminal B, with the final gates (Concourse D) and terminal already demolished in early 2022.

==== Terminal C (1992–2022) ====
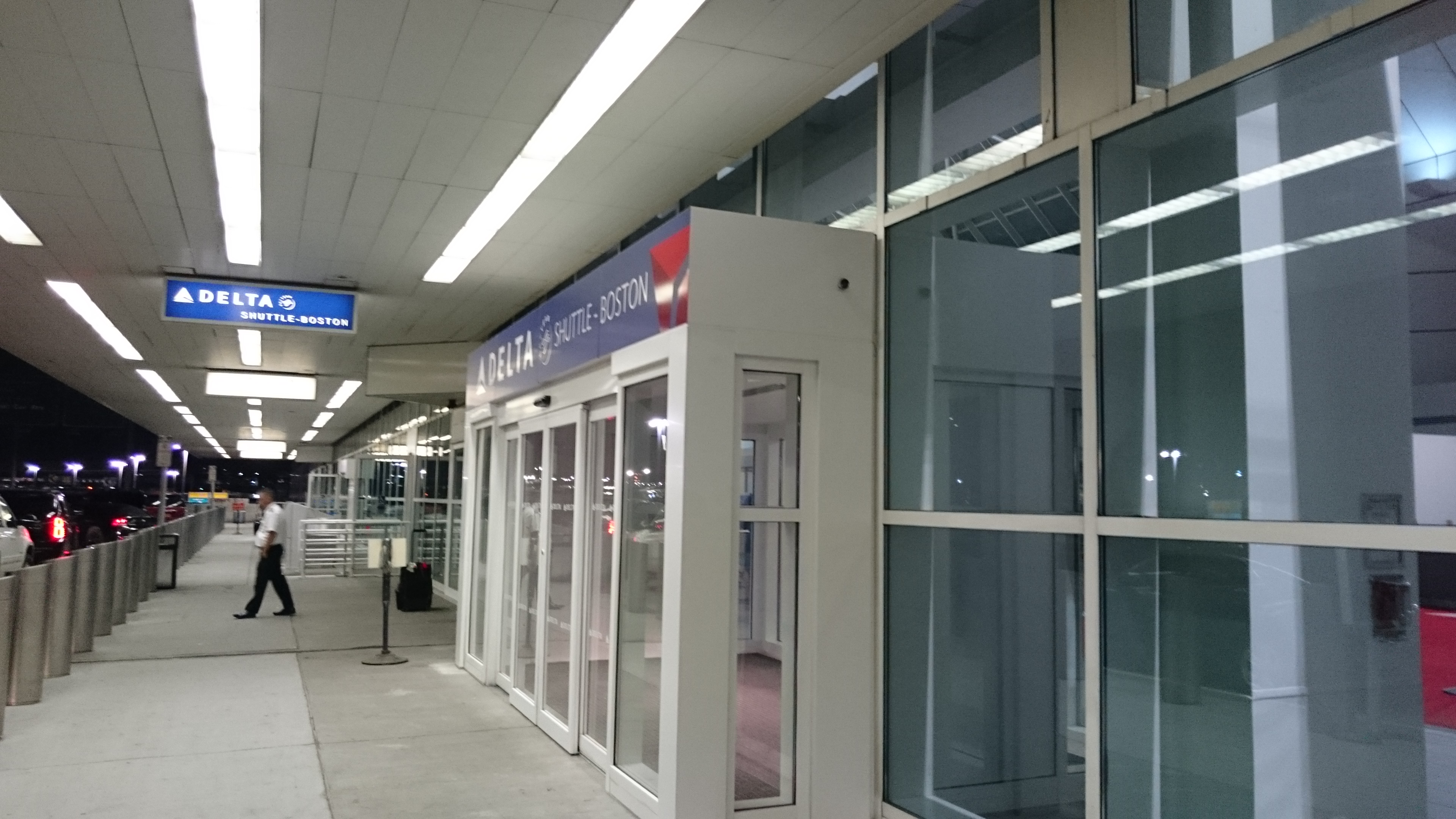
Terminal C

The original Terminal C (formerly known as the East End Terminal and USAir Terminal) was a 300,000 sq ft (28,000 m^{2}) facility that opened September 12, 1992, at a cost of $250 million. Designed by William Nicholas Bodouva + Associates Architects and Planners, it housed part of Delta's operations at LaGuardia. On June 4, 2022, Terminal C's check-in and baggage claim areas were closed.

The building was initially conceived in a 1989 agreement between the Port Authority and Texas Air Corporation (then-owner of Continental Airlines and Eastern Air Lines). When Eastern was forcibly bankrupted by Texas Air, its assets—including the new terminal's leases—were transferred to Continental. Continental never moved in, and in turn, sold the leases (along with most of its LaGuardia slots) to US Airways as part of a bankruptcy restructuring. Trump Shuttle, successor to the Eastern Air Shuttle, also occupied the terminal before becoming US Airways Shuttle.

As a result of a slot-swap deal between Delta and US Airways, as of July 2012, Delta occupied the majority of the terminal (gates C15–C44). American (the former US Airways flights) operated some flights from gates C35–C44 until December 9, 2017. The eastern concourse connected to Terminal C has been closed and demolished (Gates C15-C24), and the construction of the new Concourse E has been completed. The new concourse opened to the public on June 4, 2022. This new concourse is numbered 70–79 for its gates. Although Delta originally planned to completely replace the western concourse, it instead opted to refurbish the interior while maintaining much of the structure. These gates have been renumbered 61-69.

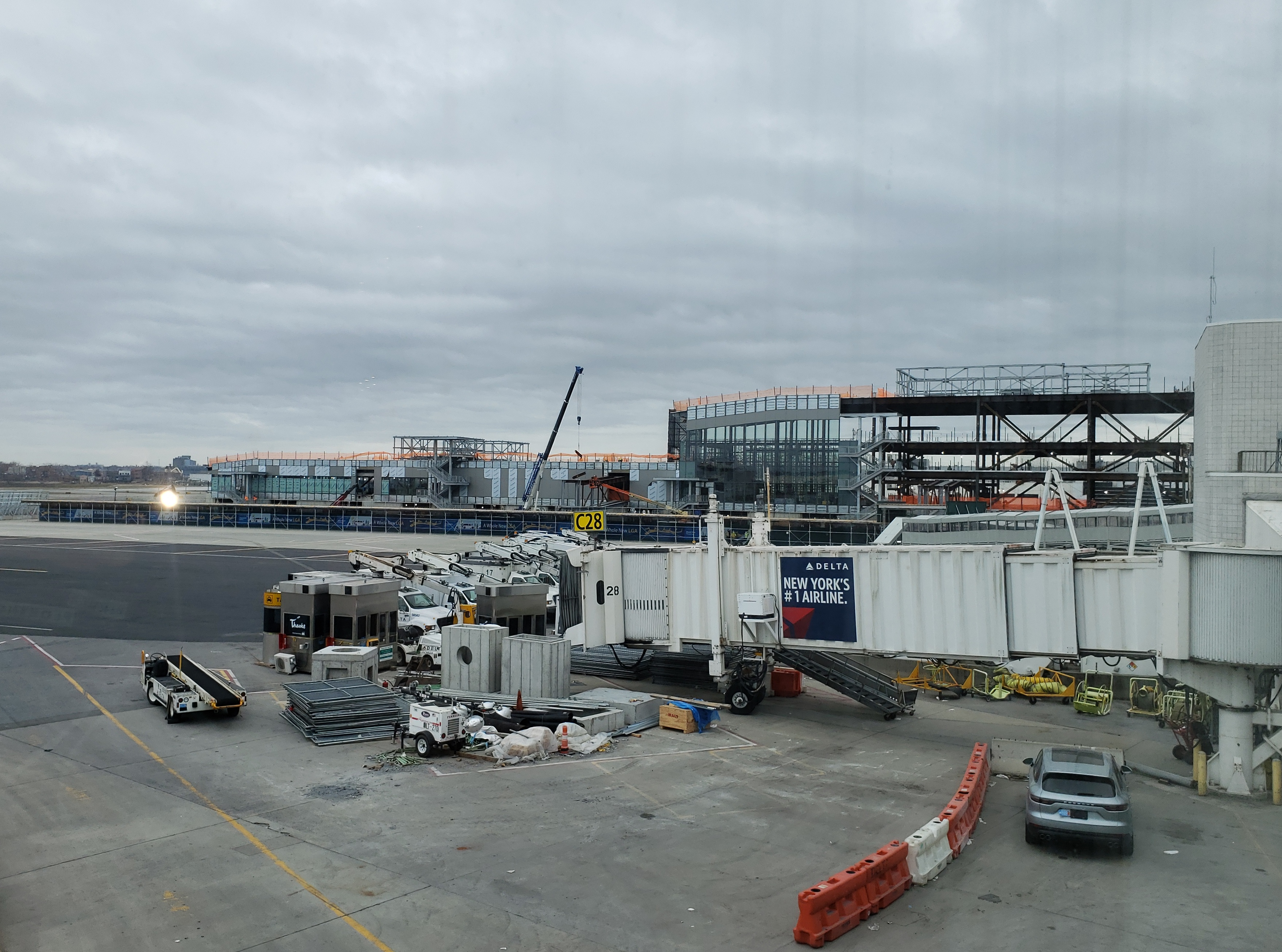
A March 2021 photograph of the new Concourse E, eventually to be connected to the new Delta Terminal C, at LaGuardia Airport

==== Terminal D (1983–2022) ====
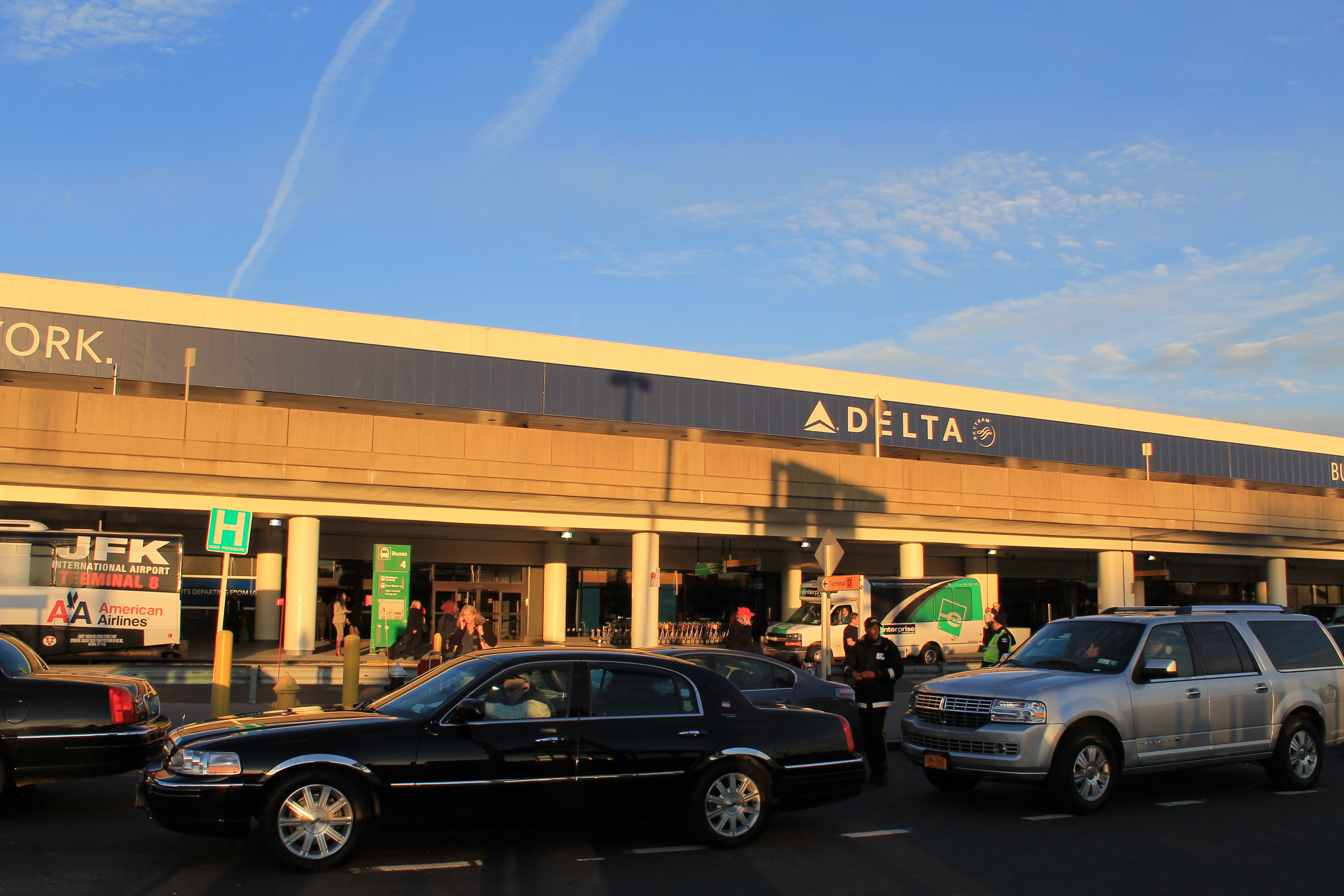
Exterior of Terminal D in 2012, now demolished

Terminal D opened on June 19, 1983, at a cost of approximately $90 million, and was designed by William Nicholas Bodouva + Associates Architects to accommodate Delta Air Lines' new Boeing 757 and Boeing 767 aircraft. This terminal also housed Northwest Airlines and Northwest Airlink from its opening in 1983 until the merger into Delta in 2009.

As of January 8, 2020, Delta Air Lines and Delta Connection operate out of the new Concourse G that was connected to Terminal D. Terminal D was connected to Terminal C by a 600-foot walkway, which opened in early 2013 as part of Delta's effort to build a hub at LaGuardia. As of September 1, 2020, however, the walkway between Terminals C and D was demolished.

As of June 4, 2022, Terminal D's check-in and baggage claim areas were closed. During the week of September 12–18, 2022, the central and eastern sections of Terminal D were demolished. The western end of Terminal D with a Delta Sky Club and gates 81–85 remained operational while the new Concourse F was constructed. After the eastern end of Concourse F fully opened, Terminal D shut down to allow installation for Concourse F's western gates. Once completed, the new concourse will use gate numbers 82–89.

=== General aviation ===
Although there is no separate terminal building for general aviation aircraft, a pseudo-terminal is operated within the Marine Air Terminal (Terminal A), which is currently run by Modern Aviation providing full FBO services to private and charter aircraft owners-pilots including 100LL and Jet A fueling, computerized weather, and flight planning as well as pilot and passenger lounges. To access the General Aviation terminal an on-airport tenant must possess a SIDA (Security Identification Display Area) badge for unescorted access, transient aircraft owners-pilots and passengers must be escorted at all times into and out of the GA Terminal and to the ramp and hangar areas by the FBO staff.

Following the September 11 attacks, the Federal Aviation Administration changed the rules for the landing and departure of general aviation aircraft at LaGuardia. Pilots operating a non-scheduled instrument flight rules (IFR) flight are now required to make a reservation via the FAA's e-CVRS system no more than 72 hours prior to the flight's arrival or departure while public charter flights may make a reservation up to six months prior. LaGuardia with a reservation from the hours of 6:00 am to 9:59 pm local time Monday thru Friday and 12:00 pm to 9:59 pm local time on Sundays. Reservations for unscheduled IFR flights are not required all day on Saturdays. Aircraft without a reservation will be redirected to either Teterboro Airport or Linden Airport.

A private seaplane base, EDO (FAA LID: 4NY2), operates three waterways in Flushing Bay and the East River north of LaGuardia Airport.

=== Other facilities ===
When New York Air was in operation, its headquarters were in Hangar 5 at LaGuardia.

Law enforcement and Aircraft rescue and firefighting (ARFF) services are provided by the Port Authority Police Department (PAPD). The agency's LaGuardia Airport Command (Building 137) was completed in 2010. Emergency medical services are provided by North Shore University Hospital under contract to the Port Authority.

Overlooking the approach end of runway 4 is Planeview Park, a public park operated by the New York City Department of Parks and Recreation. The 1.03-acre (0.42 ha) space contains park benches and lawns adjacent the Grand Central Parkway along the southern perimeter of the airport and is a prime viewing location for aircraft spotting.

== Airlines and destinations ==
=== Passenger ===
Airlines	Destinations
Air Canada	Toronto–Pearson; Seasonal: Montréal–Trudeau
Air Canada Express	Montréal–Trudeau, Toronto–Billy Bishop, Toronto–Pearson
American Airlines	Charlotte, Chicago–O'Hare, Dallas/Fort Worth, Miami, New Orleans, Orlando, Tampa, Washington–National; Seasonal: Aruba, Calgary, Fort Lauderdale, Fort Myers, Glacier Park/Kalispell, Raleigh/Durham, West Palm Beach
American Eagle	Asheville, Atlanta, Boston, Buffalo, Burlington (VT), Charleston (SC), Charlottesville (VA), Cleveland, Columbia (SC), Columbus–Glenn, Des Moines, Detroit, Fayetteville/Bentonville, Greensboro, Greenville/Spartanburg, Indianapolis, Jacksonville (FL), Little Rock, Madison, Memphis, Nashville, Norfolk, Oklahoma City, Pittsburgh, Portland (ME), Raleigh/Durham, Richmond, Roanoke, St. Louis, Savannah, Toronto–Pearson, Tulsa, Washington–National, Wilmington (NC); Seasonal: Bangor, Grand Rapids, Halifax, Hyannis, Key West, Martha's Vineyard, Myrtle Beach, Montréal–Trudeau, Nantucket, Pensacola, Traverse City
Delta Air Lines	Atlanta, Bermuda, Boston, Charleston (SC), Chicago–O'Hare, Dallas/Fort Worth, Denver, Detroit, Fort Lauderdale, Fort Myers, Houston–Intercontinental, Kansas City, Miami, Minneapolis/St. Paul, New Orleans, Orlando, Raleigh/Durham, Sarasota, Tampa, West Palm Beach; Seasonal: Bozeman, Nashville, Nassau, Salt Lake City
Delta Connection	Albany, Asheville, Bangor, Birmingham (AL), Boston, Buffalo, Burlington (VT), Charleston (SC), Charlotte, Charlottesville (VA), Chattanooga, Cincinnati, Cleveland, Columbia (SC), Columbus–Glenn, Des Moines, Fayetteville/Bentonville, Grand Rapids, Greensboro, Greenville/Spartanburg, Huntsville, Indianapolis, Jacksonville (FL), Knoxville, Lexington, Little Rock, Louisville, Madison, Memphis, Milwaukee, Montréal–Trudeau, Myrtle Beach, Nashville, Norfolk, Oklahoma City, Omaha, Pensacola, Pittsburgh, Portland (ME), Raleigh/Durham, Richmond, Roanoke, Rochester (NY), St. Louis, Savannah, Syracuse, Toronto–Pearson, Washington–National, Wilmington (NC), Worcester; Seasonal: Destin/Fort Walton Beach, Halifax, Hilton Head, Key West, Martha's Vineyard, Melbourne/Orlando (begins December 19, 2026), Nantucket, Panama City (FL), Traverse City
Frontier Airlines	Atlanta, Charlotte, Dallas/Fort Worth, Detroit, Miami, Orlando; Seasonal: San Juan
JetBlue	Fort Lauderdale, Orlando, West Palm Beach; Seasonal: Nantucket
Porter Airlines	Toronto–Pearson
Southwest Airlines	Chicago–Midway, Dallas–Love, Denver, Houston–Hobby, Kansas City, Nashville, New Orleans, Omaha, Orlando (begins March 11, 2027), St. Louis
United Airlines	Chicago–O'Hare, Denver, Houston–Intercontinental
United Express	Washington–Dulles; Seasonal: Chicago–O'Hare, Houston–Intercontinental

== Statistics ==
=== Top destinations ===
Busiest domestic routes from LGA (September 2025 – August 2026)
Rank	City	Passengers	Airlines
1	Chicago–O'Hare, Illinois	1,368,862	American, Delta, Spirit, United
2	(Georgia (U.S. state)) Atlanta, Georgia	1,084,403	American, Delta, Frontier, Southwest
3	Miami, Florida	893,202	American, Delta, Frontier, Spirit
4	Dallas/Fort Worth, Texas	859,060	American, Delta, Frontier, Spirit
5	Orlando, Florida	786,416	American, Delta, Frontier, JetBlue, Spirit
6	Fort Lauderdale, Florida	693,290	American, Delta, JetBlue, Spirit
7	Denver, Colorado	642,688	Delta, Frontier, Southwest, United
8	Charlotte, North Carolina	528,255	American, Delta, Frontier, Spirit
9	Houston–Intercontinental, Texas	521,294	Delta, Spirit, United
10	Detroit, Michigan	460,542	American, Delta, Spirit

Busiest international routes from LGA (September 2025 – August 2026)
Rank	City	Passengers	Airlines
1	Toronto–Pearson, Canada	1,022,383	Air Canada, Delta, Porter
2	Montreal, Canada	378,582	Air Canada, Delta
3	Toronto-Billy Bishop, Canada	69,283	Air Canada
4	Halifax, Canada	42,563	Delta
5	Nassau, Bahamas	27,510	Delta
6	Oranjestad, Aruba	4,237	American
7	Calgary, Canada	3,086	American
8	Bermuda	2,480	BermudAir

=== Airline market share ===
Carrier shares (September 2025 – August 2026)
1. Delta, 13,773,368 (43.3%)
2. American, 8,075,884 (25.4%)
3. Southwest, 2,949,636 (9.30%)
4. United, 2,736,116 (8.60%)
5. Spirit, 1,205,488 (3.80%)
6. Other airlines, 3,100,000 (9.60%)

Largest airlines at LGA (September 2025 – August 2026)
Rank	Airline	Passengers	Share
1	Delta Air Lines	13,773,368	43.3%
2	American Airlines	8,075,884	25.4%
3	Southwest Airlines	2,949,636	9.3%
4	United Airlines	2,736,116	8.6%
5	Spirit Airlines	1,205,488	3.8%
	Other airlines	3,100,000	9.6%

=== Annual traffic ===
Annual passenger traffic at LGA 2002–present
Year	Passengers	% Change
2002	20,715,145	—
2003	22,610,711	▲9.1%
2004	24,595,323	▲8.8%
2005	25,965,076	▲5.6%
2006	25,858,940	▼0.4%
2007	25,041,663	▼3.2%
2008	23,086,006	▼7.8%
2009	22,136,601	▼4.1%
2010	23,968,110	▲8.3%
2011	23,961,004	▼0.0%
2012	25,594,467	▲6.8%
2013	26,682,872	▲4.3%
2014	26,969,715	▲1.1%
2015	28,611,461	▲6.1%
2016	29,573,025	▲3.4%
2017	29,252,366	▼1.1%
2018	30,153,505	▲3.1%
2019	30,769,771	▲2.0%
2020	8,209,840	▼73.3%
2021	15,703,649	▲91.3%
2022	28,866,025	▲83.8%
2023	32,404,857	▲12.3%
2024	33,443,550	▲3.2%
2025	32,599,029	▼2.5%

== Ground transportation ==
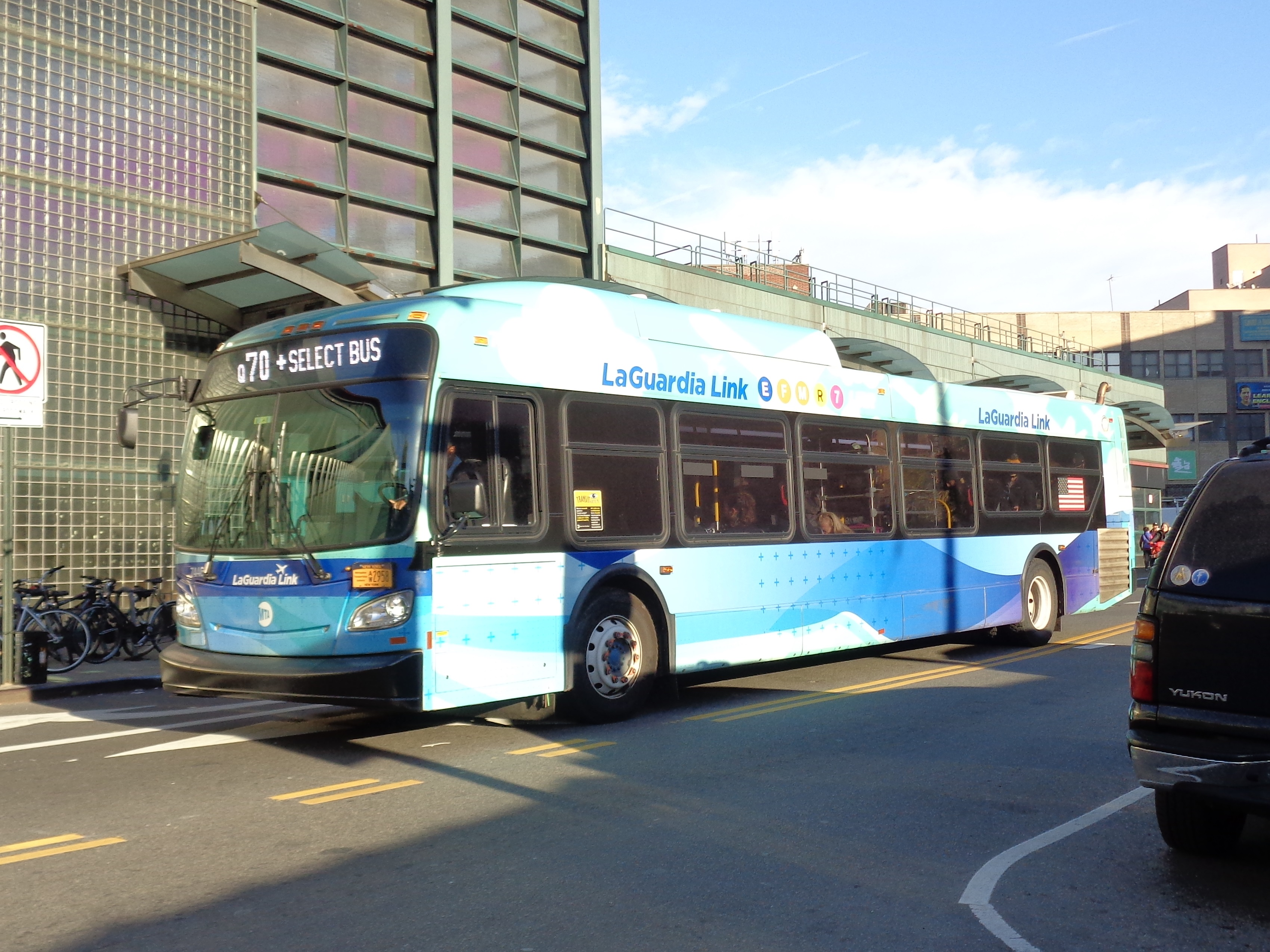
Q70 "LaGuardia Link" bus

As of 2021, buses are the only mode of mass transit to connect the airport with its surroundings. All terminals are served by accessible public MTA bus lines—including two Select Bus Services (SBS)—and free transfers to the New York City Subway are provided when passengers pay using OMNY or MetroCard.

- M60 Select Bus Service (all terminals)
- Q33 (Terminal A only)
- Q70 "LaGuardia Link" Select Bus Service (all terminals except Terminal A)
- Q72 (all terminals except Terminal A)
- Q90 (all terminals except Terminal A)

The airport also features a complementary internal shuttle bus route which makes stops at all terminals.

Despite many failed proposals throughout its history, LaGuardia is not served directly by rail. Nearby lines of the New York City Subway and Long Island Rail Road (LIRR), however, provide northern Queens with connections to the greater New York metropolitan area and are commonly accessed from the airport by public bus or private car services.

The airport is mainly accessible via the Grand Central Parkway and overpasses at 94th Street and 102nd Street. Taxicabs serving LaGuardia are metered and licensed by the New York City Taxi and Limousine Commission, and uniformed airport employees are stationed to dispatch fares. For-hire-vehicles (FHV) including limousines and rideshare operators are accommodated at designated locations. In 2019, PANYNJ approved the implementation of "airport access fee" surcharges on FHV and taxi trips, with the revenue earmarked to support the agency's capital programs.

== See also ==
John F. Kennedy International Airport

- New York World War II Army airfields
