= Michel Landel =

Michel Landel was born on 7 November 1951 in Meknes, Morocco. He was the CEO, director and chairman of the executive committee of Sodexo until January 2018.

== Biography ==
After graduating from the European Business School, Michel Landel worked for Chase Manhattan Bank and then for the Poliet Group. He decided to leave the banking world and joined Sodexo in 1984 as Operations Manager for Eastern and Northern Africa. In 1989 he was promoted to Operations Manager for the North America region. In barely ten years, he propelled the company to fourth place in the catering services market. In 1999, he managed the merger with Marriott Management Services; the resulting Sodexho Marriott Services became the world leader in its sector.

On 1 September 2005, he was promoted to CEO of Sodexo, taking over from the company’s founder, Pierre Bellon, who remained as Chairman of the group. Following the dollar's fall relative to the Euro in that year, Sodexo experienced two years of declining operating profits. Michel Landel’s strategy was therefore to diversify Sodexo’s service offer beyond catering services and to expand the group’s presence in emerging countries. In 2012, he explained "While food services rose by an average of 3.5%, other services grew by 7.8% and their share increased from 18% to 25% of sales in four years." He has also initiated a number of actions aimed at contributing to the economic and social development of countries where Sodexo operates. These include STOP Hunger, a programme fighting hunger and malnutrition, which is active in 42 countries.

In 2018, Danone's Board of Directors appointed Michel Landel as Lead Independent Director and Chairman of the Nomination and Remuneration Committee.

Since May 2019, Michel Landel has been an Independent Director of the French company Legrand.

== Awards ==
Michel Landel has been honoured with two awards for his actions in favour of diversity in companies:

- CEO Leadership Award for Diversity Best Practices
- CEO Advocate of the Year from the Asian Enterprise Magazine

He is also a Chevalier (Knight) of the French Order of the Legion of Honour.

In November 2015, Harvard Business Review ranks Michel Landel 67th best-performing CEO in the world.

== Private life ==
Michel Landel is married and has three children.
