= Damian Bellón =

Swiss footballer and manager (born 1989)

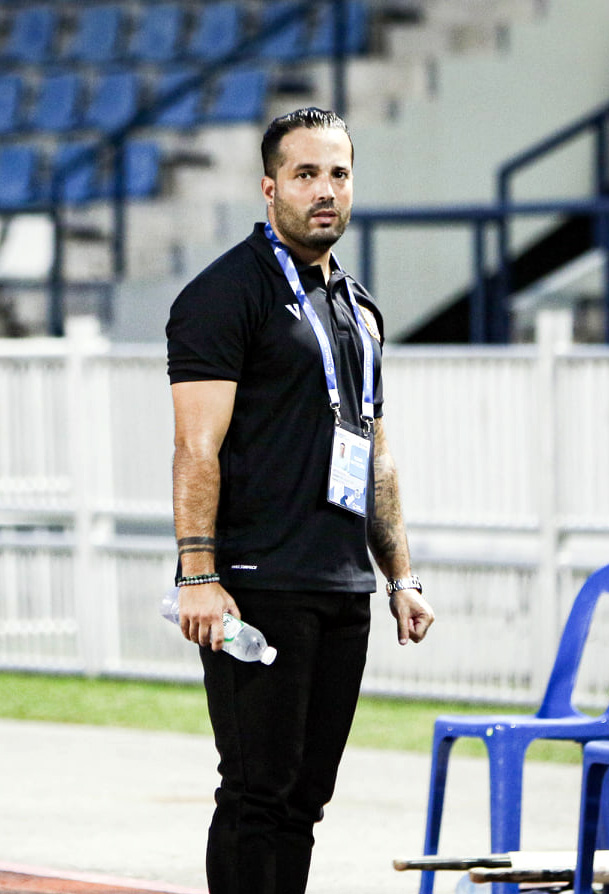
- Bellón in 2021

Personal information
- Full name: Diego Damián Bellon
- Date of birth: 28 August 1989 (age 37)
- Place of birth: St. Gallen, Switzerland
- Height: 1.71 m (5 ft 7 in)
- Position: Midfielder

Youth career
- 2004–2006: FC St. Gallen
- 2006–2008: Aston Villa

Senior career*
Years	Team	Apps	(Gls)
2008–2011	FC Vaduz	59	(0)
2011–2012	SC Brühl	22	(5)
2012–2013	Veria	7	(0)
2013–2014	Panetolikos	37	(9)
2014	→ Aiginiakos (loan)	9	(2)
2015	Panargiakos	4	(2)
2015	Saraburi	7	(2)
2016	Chiangmai	0	(0)

International career
2008	Switzerland U-21	1	(0)

Managerial career
- 2018–2021: Ranong United
- 2021: MOF Customs United
- 2021–2022: Phitsanulok
- 2022: Samutsongkhram
- 2023: Young Singh Hatyai United
- 2023–2024: Pattani
- * Club domestic league appearances and goals

Damian Bellón (born 28 August 1989) is a Swiss former footballer and current football manager. He is the former coach of Thai League 3 club Pattani.

Bellón spent time in the academies of FC St. Gallen and English Premier League side Aston Villa, and appeared for the Switzerland U-21 as a youth player. In his professional career, he played for a number of sides in his home country of Switzerland, Greece, and Thailand, before becoming a coach at Ranong United, MOF Customs United, Phitsanulok and Samutsongkhram.

== Career ==
Damian moved on 11 July 2006 with his twin brother Yagó Bellón from FC St. Gallen to Aston Villa. On 7 July 2008, Bellón announced he was leaving Aston Villa to head to Liechtenstein to play for FC Vaduz of the Swiss Super League.

Damian moved in July 2012 to Veria, a Greek team currently playing in the Super League Greece where he made seven appearances. He could not settle himself so, during the winter transfer window, on 31 January 2013, Damian Bellon joined Panetolikos on a 1.5-year contract. Panaitolikos is currently part of the Greek Football League

On 25 January 2014, Bellon signed a 6-month contract going on loan to Aiginiakos.

Bellón later moved to Thailand to play professionally with spells at Saraburi, Chiangmai before becoming the first team coach at Ranong United in Thai League 3 in October 2018.

He was appointed on 19 April 2021 as head coach for MOF Customs United. after a successful first season on Thai League 2 with Ranong United.

== Personal life ==
Bellón has represented Switzerland at both the Under 17 and Under 19 levels. He is of Spanish descent and is the twin brother of retired football player Yagó Bellón. After retirement from football, Yagó commented on how their father was incredibly strict and had made him and Damian train in isolation daily from a young age to achieve a professional contract, to the detriment of their school work and social life.
