= Yagó Bellón =

Swiss footballer (born 1989)

Yago Bellón
Personal information
- Full name: Yago Bellón
- Date of birth: 28 August 1989 (age 37)
- Place of birth: St. Gallen, Switzerland
- Height: 1.74 m (5 ft 8 1/2 in)
- Position: Midfielder

Team information
- Current team: FC Tägerwilen

Youth career
- 2004–2006: FC St. Gallen
- 2006–2008: Aston Villa

Senior career*
Years	Team	Apps	(Gls)
2008–2009	FC St. Gallen II	19	(3)
2009–2011	FC Wil 1900	24	(17)
2011	FC Gossau	16	(1)
2011–2013	FC Kreuzlingen	42	(33)
2013–2014	FC Tägerwilen		

International career
2006	Switzerland U18	1	(0)
- * Club domestic league appearances and goals as of 18 July 2009

Yago Bellón (born 28 August 1989) is a Swiss former association footballer.

Primarily right-footed, Bellón operated in midfield or as a full-back. Despite playing the majority of his career in his native Switzerland, Bellón was once a player for the academy of English Premier League side Aston Villa. His twin brother Damian Bellón was also a professional footballer and is now managing a side in Thailand. Yago now works in the banking sector in Switzerland.

== Career ==
=== Aston Villa ===
Bellón signed for English Premier League side Aston Villa from local side FC St. Gallen in 2006, along with his twin brother Damian. However, neither managed to get further than Villa's reserve side and were both released two years later.

=== Return to Switzerland ===
Yagó re-signed for his previous club FC St. Gallen, where he remained for one season, playing in their under-21 side.

At the end of the 2008–09 season, he joined FC Wil on a free transfer. Bellón made a total of 26 appearances for FC Wil, with 24 of those coming in the league. He dropped down a division to join FC Gossau in January 2011. In October 2011, he signed for FC Kreuzlingen on a free transfer. In September 2013, Bellón transferred to FC Tägerwilen.

== Retirement ==
Bellón retired from semi-professional football in 2014 and retrained in the financial sector, and was working at the Thurgauer Kantonalbank in Switzerland in 2019.

== Personal life ==
His twin brother Damian was also a professional footballer and is now managing MOF Customs United in the Thai League 2. After retirement from football, Yagó commented on how his father was incredibly strict and had made him and his brother train in isolation daily from a young age to achieve a professional contract, to the detriment of their school work and social life.
