= United Coffee =

Swiss coffee company

- Founded: 1818, 's-Hertogenbosch (den Bosch), Netherlands
- Headquarters: Geneva, Switzerland
- Key people: Per Harkjaer, CEO
- Products: Coffee
- Services: Coffee, coffee machines and related services
- Number of employees: 1000 (estimated)

United Coffee is a European coffee roaster. It produces and distributes a wide range of coffee, coffee machines, and related services through retail and out-of-home distribution channels, including hotels, restaurants, and cafés. The company is based in Geneva, Switzerland.

== Company ==
United Coffee was founded in 1818 and now employs around 1,000 people and roasts over 60,000 tons of coffee per year. The company also buys 1% of the world's total coffee exports per year. The company owns retail and out-of-home brands such as Grand Café, Templo, Rosca, and Smit & Dorlas.

The company is owned by UCC Holdings Limited, a privately held Japanese company engaged in the production and sale of coffee products. United Coffee is a leading roaster across six European countries: France, Germany, Netherlands, Spain, Switzerland and the United Kingdom.

== History ==
The history of United Coffee dates back to 1818 when a roaster, Mr. Sweens and his family, founded the company, then named Drie Mollen, in 's-Hertogenbosch (den Bosch) in the south of the Netherlands. By the late 1900s, Drie Mollen had begun its development into an international coffee roasting business. By the 1990s, five leading tea and coffee companies had joined the original founding Sweens family, and the business continued to grow and develop.

In 2008, CapVest, the private equity fund, bought Drie Mollen. In March 2010, the company was rebranded United Coffee and its head office was moved from the Netherlands to Geneva. In 2012, CapVest sold United Coffee to UCC Holdings Limited.
