= Pierre Bellon =

French businessman (1930–2022)

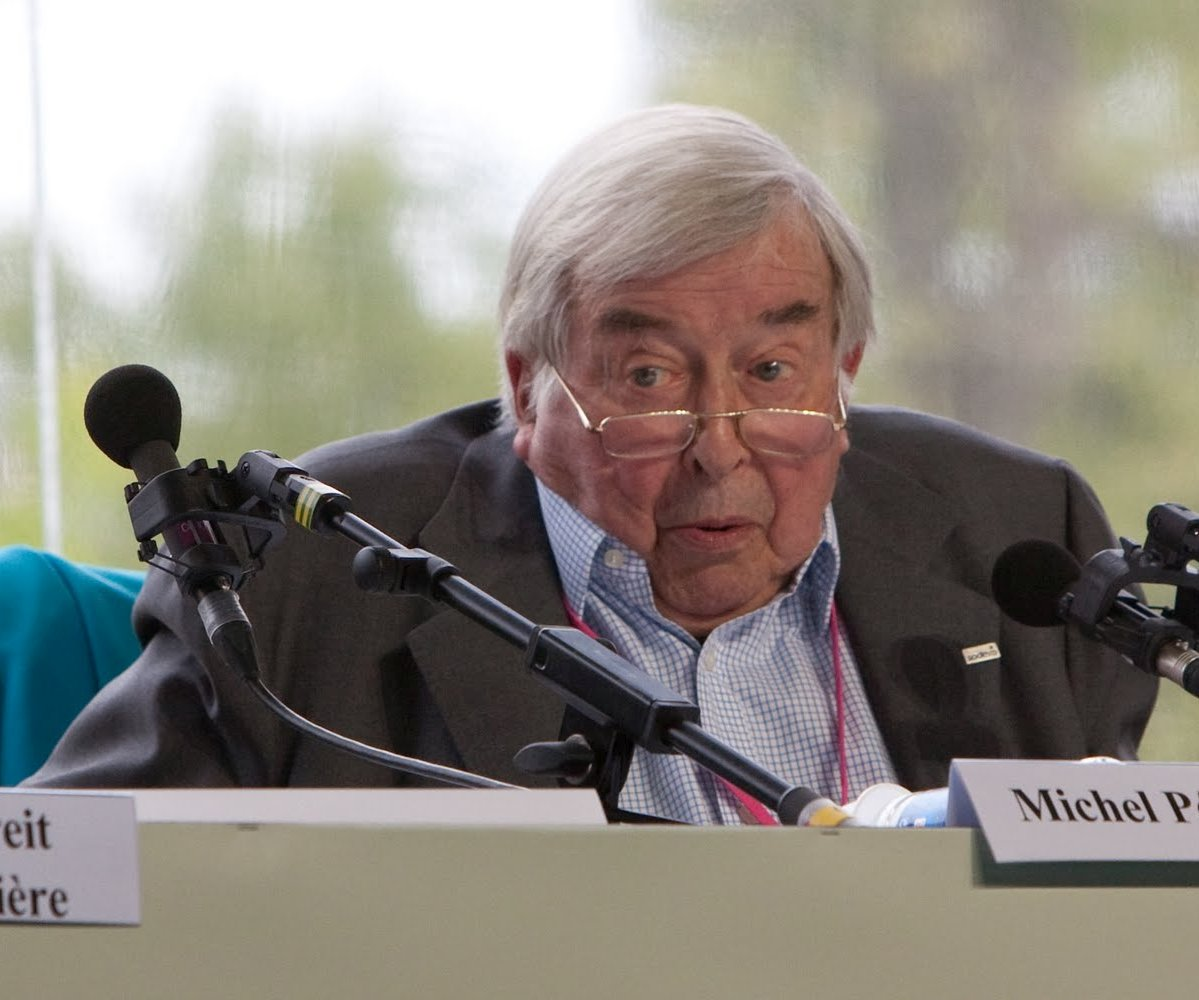
- Bellon in 2009
- Born: 24 January 1930; Marseille, France
- Died: 31 January 2022 (aged 92)
- Education: HEC Paris
- Occupation(s): Chairman and founder, Sodexo
- Children: 4, including Sophie Bellon

Pierre Bellon (24 January 1930 – 31 January 2022) was a French billionaire businessman, the founder of Sodexo, a multinational food service and facilities management company.

== Early life ==
Pierre Bellon earned a degree from HEC Paris.

== Career ==
Pierre Bellon began his career in 1958 in the family business, as a sales representative, then management assistant, a position in which he managed to win various contracts.

In 1966, with the help of his family, he founded Sodexho SA (Société d'exploitations hôtelières, aériennes, maritimes et terrestres). This company, which was renamed Sodexo in 2008, supplies a variety of auxiliary services for thousands of institutions, including schools, hospitals, retirement centres, corporate and government offices, armed forces, recreational facilities, and correctional institutions. Sodexo is a public traded company on New York and Paris exchanges.

Bellon relinquished the group CEO position of Sodexo in 2005, but continued as the chairman of the company until January 2016, when his daughter Sophie Bellon succeeded him as chairwoman.

In 1987, he contributed to the creation of the non-profit Association Progrès du Management, whose purpose is to focus on the progress of the company through the progress of its leaders.

His autobiography is entitled I Have Had a Great Time.

== Personal life and death ==
Bellon was married, with four children, and lived in Paris. He died on 31 January 2022, at the age of 92.
