= Sophie Bellon =

French businesswoman (born 1961)

- Born: 1961 (age 64–65)
- Education: EDHEC
- Occupation: Businesswoman
- Title: Chairwoman, Sodexo
- Term: January 2016-
- Predecessor: Pierre Bellon
- Board member of: Sodexo
- Spouse: Divorced
- Children: 3
- Parent: Pierre Bellon

Sophie Bellon (born 1961) is a French businesswoman, and the chairwoman of Sodexo, a company founded by her father Pierre Bellon.

== Early life ==
Sophie Bellon earned a degree from EDHEC business school in Paris in 1983.

== Career ==
Bellon started her career with Crédit Lyonnais in New York.

Bellon had been a director of Sodexo since 1989, and succeeded her father as chair in January 2016.

Bellon has been appointed as a member of the Board of Pluxee Group since 2024.

== Personal life ==
She was known as Sophie Clamens until her divorce. She has three grown-up children.
