= Magic Johnson Enterprises =

American investment company

- Industry: Investing
- Founded: 1987
- Founder: Magic Johnson
- Headquarters: Beverly Hills, California; United States of America
- Website: Magic Johnson Enterprise

Magic Johnson Enterprises is an investment company founded by Basketball Hall of Famer and entrepreneur Magic Johnson. The company was founded in 1987 and is based in Beverly Hills, California.

Magic Johnson Enterprises formerly owned Magic Johnson Theatres and 24-Hour Fitness/Magic Johnson Sport health clubs. Over the years, Magic Johnson Enterprises has continually invested ownership in many lucrative businesses such as the Los Angeles Lakers, movie theaters and restaurants in the United States, including T.G.I. Friday's, Sodexo, and Burger King locations.

== Investments ==
In 1995, Johnson took an equity stake along with what was then the Loews chain in the 12-screen multiplex movie theater in Baldwin Hills (now owned by Cinemark).

The company teamed up with Starbucks in 1998, acquiring around 125 stores and in October 2010 sold 105 of the stores in a $100 million deal.

In March 2008, Johnson signed a multi-year marketing deal to help electronics retailer Best Buy Co. bolster sales in urban neighborhoods.

In October 2010, he sold his 4% interest in the Los Angeles Lakers for an estimated $27 million to Patrick Soon-Shiong.

In 2006, the company made headlines for concluding a deal with Sodexo, one of the largest food services and facilities management companies in the world. The initiative includes a marketing agreement and the formation of SodexoMAGIC, LLC, a new joint venture that is 51 percent owned by Johnson.

In June 2015, the company announced it had acquired a controlling interest in EquiTrust Life Insurance Co. In 2025, EquiTrust was sold to Amistad Financial Group, whose CEO Eric Holoman is a longtime business partner of Johnson and a former president of Magic Johnson Enterprises.

== Sports teams ==
Co-ownership of the LA Dodgers was purchased by Magic Johnson Enterprises in 2012 for a reported $2 billion.

In 2014, Johnson led the purchase of WNBA team, Los Angeles Sparks with Guggenheim Partners. The same year, he became part owner of MLS team, Los Angeles FC.

In 2023, Magic Johnson Enterprises, along with a group of others, purchased the Washington DC–based NFL team Washington Commanders for $6.05 billion.

In September 2024, Johnson invested in Washington DC–based National Women's Soccer League (NWSL) club, Washington Spirit.

== Canyon-Johnson Urban Fund ==
Johnson's urban investments were formed in 2001 as the Canyon-Johnson Urban Fund, an alliance with Canyon Capital. The alliance has financed 31 real estate developments in 13 states and the District Of Columbia. The first Canyon-Johnson Urban Fund struggled for two years to raise $300 million to invest in urban neighborhoods. A subsequent fund raised $600 million while the third and biggest investment fund was started in April 2008 and drew $1 billion from pension funds and other investors. The Canyon-Johnson fund was involved in the $100-million purchase of the 32-story former Transamerica Center complex in downtown Los Angeles that subsequently was renovated and sold for $205 million. The fund also had a stake in Sunset+Vine in Hollywood, which was built for $125 million and sold for $160 million.
