= Steinway & Sons =

German-American piano company

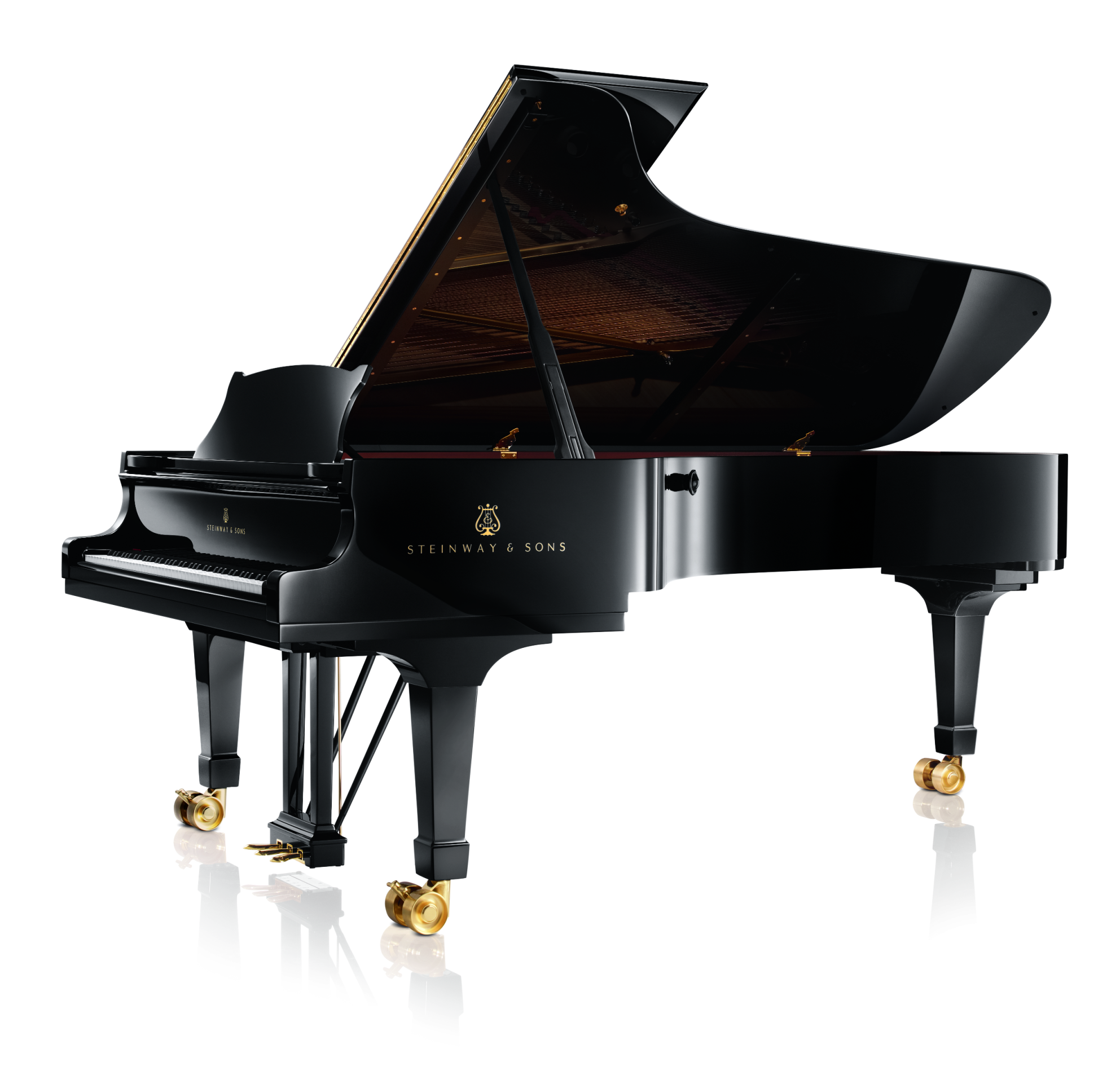
- Steinway & Sons concert grand piano, Model D-274
- Type: Private
- Industry: Musical instruments
- Founded: March 5, 1853 (173 years ago) in Manhattan, New York City
- Founder: Heinrich Engelhard Steinweg (later known as Henry E. Steinway)
- Headquarters: One Steinway Place, Queens, New York, New York, U.S. 40°46′45″N 73°53′59″W; Europe and international: Rondenbarg 10, Hamburg, Germany 53°34′27″N 9°55′27″E
- Number of locations: 200 authorized dealers operating 300 showrooms worldwide
- Area served: Worldwide
- Products: Pianos
- Production output: 2,600 pianos (annually)
- Services: Restoration of Steinway pianos
- Parent: Paulson & Co. Inc.
- Website: www.steinway.com

Steinway & Sons, also known as Steinway (/ˈstaɪnweɪ/), is a German-American piano company, founded in 1853 in New York City by the German piano builder Heinrich Engelhard Steinweg (later known as Henry E. Steinway). The company's growth led to a move to a larger factory in New York, and later opening an additional factory in Hamburg, Germany. The New York factory, in the borough of Queens, supplies the Americas, and the factory in Hamburg supplies the rest of the world.

Steinway is a prominent piano company, known for its high quality and for inventions within the area of piano development. Steinway has been granted 139 patents in piano making, with the first in 1857. The company's share of the high-end grand piano market consistently exceeds 80 percent. The dominant position has been criticized, with some musicians and writers arguing that it has blocked innovation and led to a homogenization of the sound favored by pianists.

Steinway pianos have received numerous awards. One of the first is a gold medal in 1855 at the American Institute Fair at the New York Crystal Palace. From 1855 to 1862, Steinway pianos received 35 gold medals. More awards and recognitions followed, including three medals at the International Exposition of 1867 in Paris. The European part of the company held a royal warrant of appointment to Queen Elizabeth II. Steinway & Sons was named Company of the Year in 1996 by The Music Trades magazine. The award was given in recognition of Steinway's "overall performance, quality, value-added products, a well-executed promotional program and disciplined distribution which generated the most impressive results in the entire music industry."

In addition to the Steinway piano line, Steinway produce two other, lower-priced brands of piano sold under the brand names Boston and Essex.

== History ==
=== Foundation and growth ===
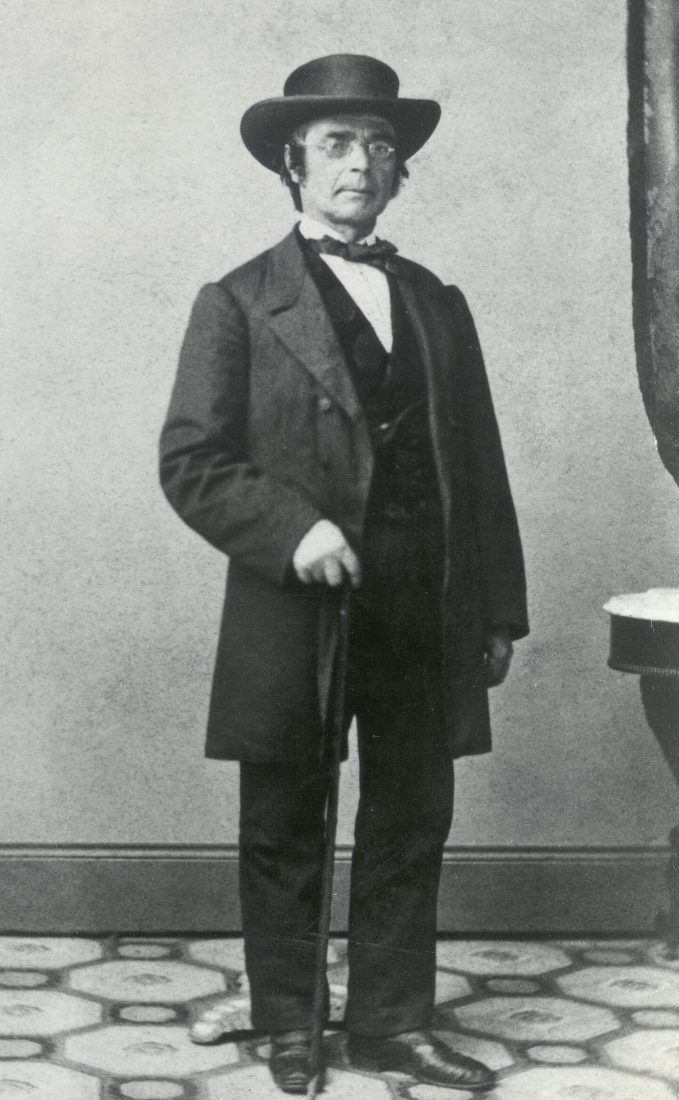
Photograph of Heinrich Engelhard Steinweg

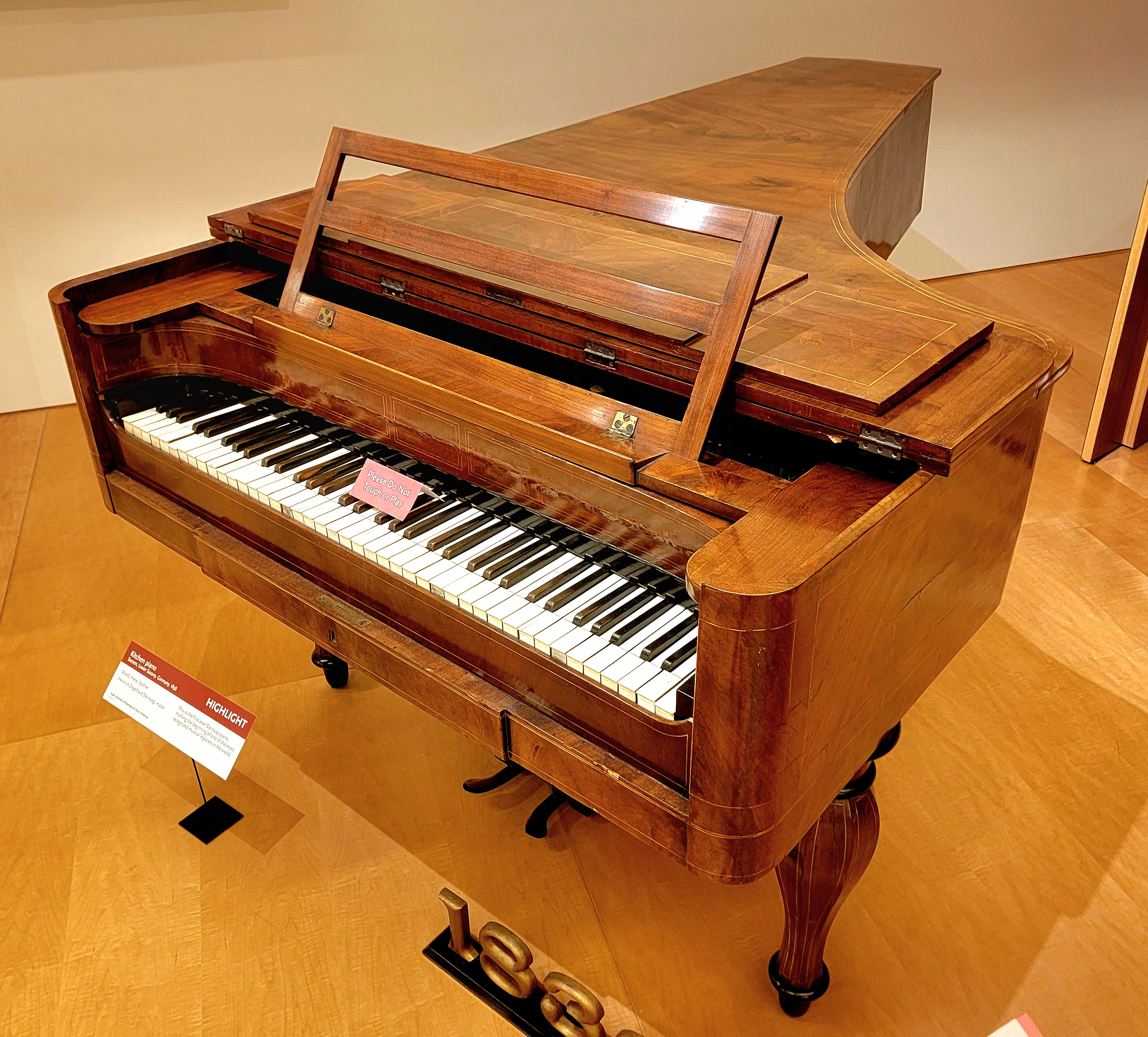
First Steinway piano (1836) in the Musical Instrument Museum, Phoenix, Arizona

Heinrich Engelhard Steinweg first made pianos in the 1820s from his house in Seesen, Germany. He made pianos under the Steinweg brand until he emigrated from Germany to the United States in 1850 with his wife and seven of his nine children. The eldest son, C. F. Theodor Steinweg, remained in Germany, and continued making the Steinweg brand of pianos, partnering with Friedrich Grotrian, a piano dealer, from 1856 to 1865.

In 1853, Heinrich Engelhard Steinweg founded Steinway & Sons. His first workshop in the United States was in a small loft at the back of 85 Varick Street in the borough of Manhattan in New York City. The first piano made by Steinway & Sons was given the number 483 because Heinrich Engelhard Steinweg had built 482 pianos in Germany. Number 483 was sold to a New York family for $500, and is now on display at the Städtisches Museum Seesen, the town in which Heinrich Engelhard Steinweg began his career as a piano maker. A year later, demand was such that the company moved to larger premises at 82–88 Walker Street. It was not until 1864 that the family anglicized their name from Steinweg to Steinway.

By the 1860s, Steinway had built and moved into a factory at Park Avenue between 52nd and 53rd Street (the present site of the Seagram Building) where it covered a whole block. With a workforce of 350 men, production increased from 500 to nearly 1,800 pianos per year. The employees were mostly German immigrants and the official language of the company was German. The pianos themselves underwent numerous substantial improvements through innovations made both at the Steinway factory and elsewhere in the industry based on emerging engineering and scientific research, including developments in the understanding of acoustics. Almost half of the company's 139 patented inventions were developed by the first and second generations of the Steinway family. Steinway's pianos won prizes at exhibitions in New York City, London, and Paris. By 1862, Steinway pianos had received more than 35 medals. Part of Steinway's early reputation arose from its successes in trade fairs.

In 1865, the Steinway family sent a letter to C. F. Theodor Steinweg asking that he leave the German Steinweg factory (by then located in Braunschweig (Brunswick)) and travel to New York City to take over the leadership of the family firm due to the deaths of his brothers Henry and Charles from disease. C. F. Theodor Steinweg obeyed, selling his share of the German piano company to his partner Wilhelm Grotrian (son of Friedrich Grotrian) and two other workmen, Adolph Helfferich and H. G. W. Schulz. The German factory changed its name from C. F. Theodor Steinweg to Grotrian, Helfferich, Schulz, Th. Steinweg Nachf. (English: Grotrian, Helfferich, Schulz, successors to Th. Steinweg), later shortened to Grotrian-Steinweg. In New York City, C. F. Theodor Steinweg anglicized his name to C. F. Theodore Steinway. During the next 15 years of his leadership, he kept a home in Braunschweig and traveled often between Germany and the United States.

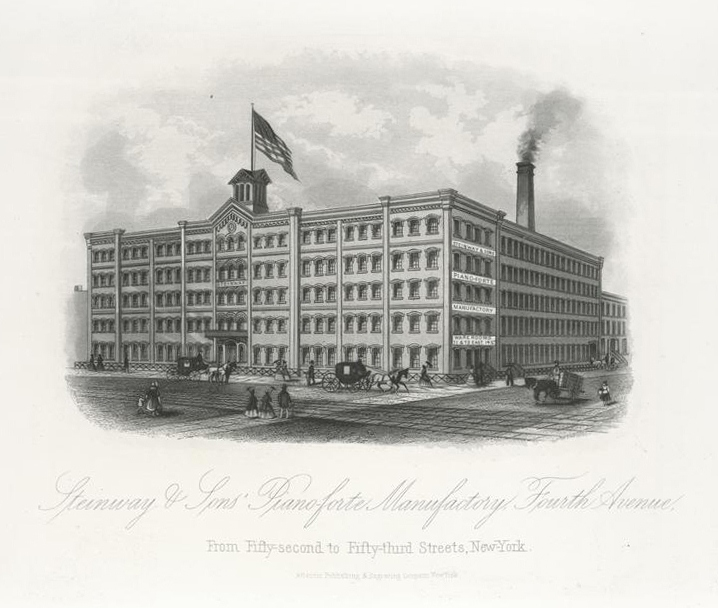
Steinway's factory in Manhattan, 1876

Through 1870–80, William Steinway (born Wilhelm Steinweg, a son of Heinrich Engelhard Steinweg) established a company town after purchasing a home and its surrounding property from the widow of Benjamin Pike Jr., that would later bear his name as the Steinway Mansion. This company town would go on to become Steinway Village in what is now the Astoria neighborhood of Queens in New York City. Steinway Village was built as its own town, and included a new factory (still used today) with its own foundry and sawmill, houses for employees, kindergarten, lending library, post office, volunteer fire department, and parks. Steinway Village later became part of Long Island City. Steinway Street, one of the major streets in the Astoria and Long Island City neighborhoods of Queens, is named after the company.

In 1876, Steinway participated in the Centennial Exposition in Philadelphia. The competition among piano makers principally involved Steinway, Chickering, and Weber. According to journalist James Barron's account of Steinway's participation in the competition, the company was able to secure success by bribing one of the judges. William Steinway denied to the exposition's organizers that a judge had been paid directly, although Barron states that the judge was bribed through an intermediary, the pianist Frederic Boscovitz. According to freelancer Isabel Wolff, William Steinway admitted in his diary that under his leadership the New York City arm of the company bribed judges at trade fairs to favor Steinway pianos. According to musicologist Donald W. Fostle, it is untrue that Steinway repeatedly bribed judges at trade fairs, and in the one documented case it is unclear if Steinway were enmeshed, along with others, in bribery or were the target of attempted extortion.

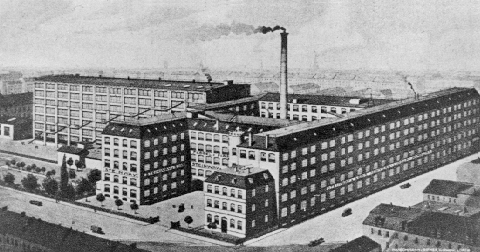
Steinway's factory in Hamburg, Germany, 1915

To reach European customers who wanted Steinway pianos, and to avoid high European import taxes, William Steinway and C. F. Theodore Steinway established a new piano factory in the free German city of Hamburg in 1880. The first address of Steinway's factory in Hamburg was at Schanzenstraße in the western part of Hamburg, St. Pauli. C. F. Theodore Steinway became the head of the German factory, and William Steinway went back to the factory in New York. The two factories regularly exchanged experience about their patents and techniques despite the large distance between them, and they continue to do so today. C. F. Theodore Steinway was a talented inventor who made many improvements in the construction of the piano. About a third of Steinway's patented inventions are under the name of C. F. Theodore Steinway. The Steinway factory in Hamburg was part laboratory, part factory. Much of the precision cutting and drilling machinery installed in the New York factory was tried in the Hamburg factory first. C. F. Theodore Steinway died in Braunschweig in 1889, having successfully competed against the Grotrian-Steinweg brand – both the Hamburg-based Steinway factory and the Braunschweig-based Grotrian-Steinweg factory became known for making premium German pianos.

Meanwhile, the 1880s saw the company embroiled in a series of labor disputes between the New York City factory's management and workers. Back then, industrialists faced labor strikes frequently. One dispute, in 1880, saw the company lead an industry-wide lockout of piano workers in New York City. In later disputes in the decade, the company hired detectives to spy on its workers, paid police to take management's side in the dispute and to protect company property, and evicted strike leaders from company housing.

In 1883, the Hungarian composer and pianist Franz Liszt wrote in a letter to Steinway: "...The new Steinway grand is a glorious masterpiece in power, sonority, singing quality, and perfect harmonic effects, affording delight even to my old piano-weary fingers. Ever continuing success remains a beautiful attribute of the world-renowned firm of Steinway & Sons. ...Owing to my ignorance of the mechanism of piano construction I can but praise the magnificent result in the volume and quality of sound."

In 1890, Steinway received its first royal warrant, granted by Queen Victoria. The following year the patrons of Steinway included the Prince of Wales and other members of royalty and nobility. In subsequent years Steinway was granted royal and imperial warrants from the rulers of Italy, Norway, Persia, Portugal, Romania, Russia, Spain, Sweden, and Turkey.

=== Steinway Halls ===
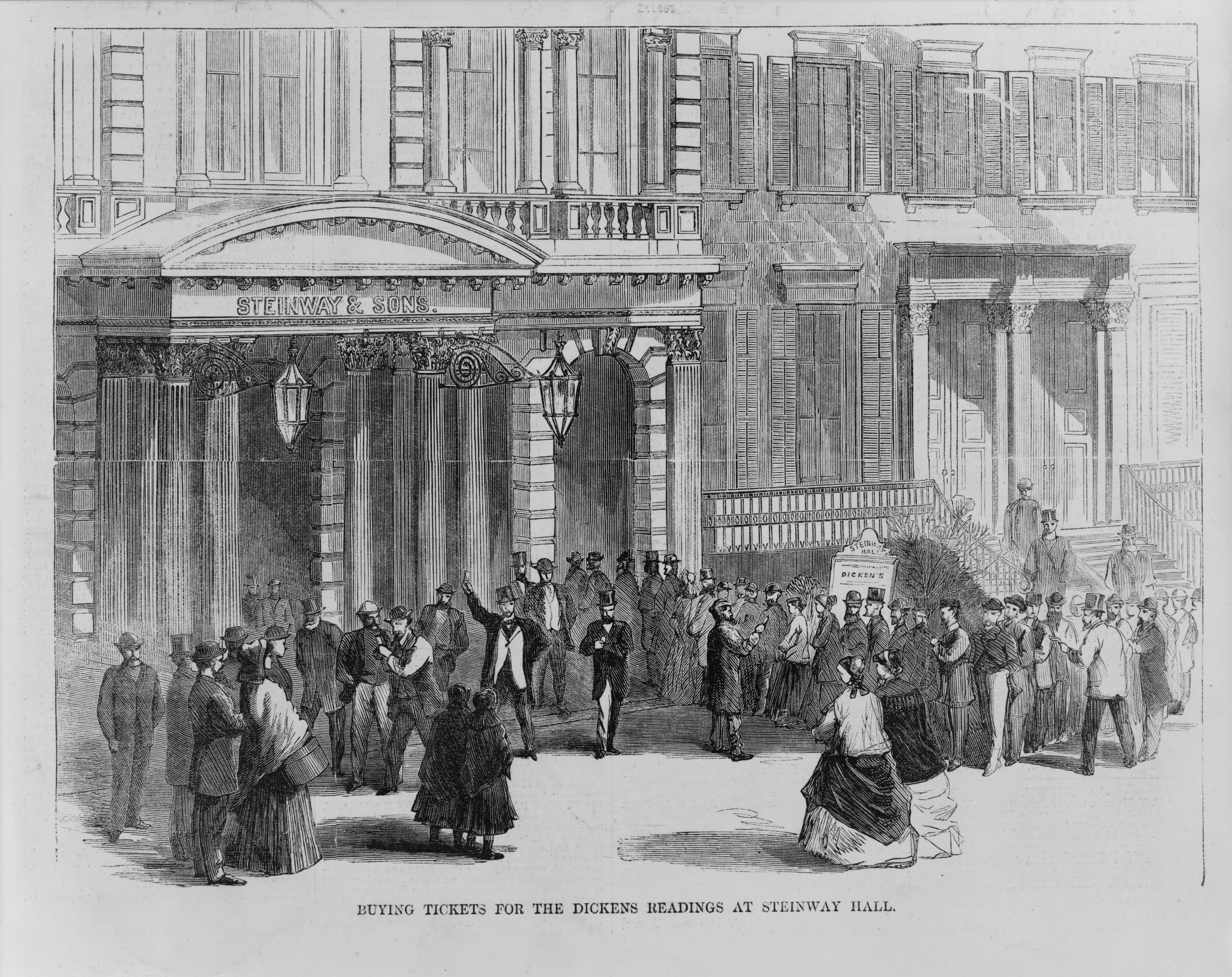
Crowd of spectators buying tickets for a Charles Dickens reading at the Steinway Hall in New York City, 1867

From 1864 to 1866, William Steinway, who is credited with establishing Steinway's success in marketing, oversaw the construction of Steinway Hall on East 14th Street in Manhattan, New York City. Steinway Hall had cost $200,000 to build. It included the second largest concert hall in New York City as well as showrooms for Steinway pianos. To enter the concert hall concertgoers had to pass through the showrooms, a way to advertise Steinway pianos. Sales increased by more than 400 pianos in 1867. Steinway Hall quickly became one of New York City's most prominent cultural centers, housing the New York Philharmonic for the next 25 years until Carnegie Hall opened in 1891.

In 1925, the Steinway Hall on East 14th Street was closed and a new Steinway Hall on West 57th Street was opened. In 2013, Steinway sold the Steinway Hall on West 57th Street for $46 million and moved out of the building at the end of 2014. In 2016, a new Steinway Hall opened on Sixth Avenue.

A second Steinway Hall was opened in London in 1875. It was located first on Wigmore Street, in 1924 it moved to St. George Street, and later it moved to its current address on Marylebone Lane.

=== Expansion ===
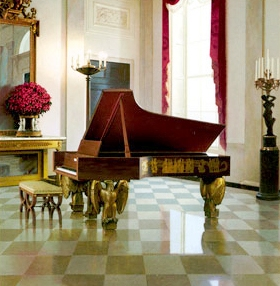
The White House's Steinway art case piano from 1938 in the Entrance Hall

In 1857, Steinway began to make a line of art case pianos, designed by artists. In 1903, the 100,000th Steinway grand piano was given as a gift to the White House; it was decorated by the artist Thomas Wilmer Dewing. The 100,000th Steinway grand piano was replaced in 1938 by the 300,000th, which remains in use in the White House. The piano is normally placed in the largest room of the White House, the East Room.

Harold Bauer playing Saint-Saëns' Piano Concerto No. 2 in G minor, Op. 22, an excerpt of 3rd movement. Duo-Art recording 5973-4 played on a Steinway grand piano model XR 6'2" Duo-Art from 1920.

Later, Steinway diversified into the manufacture of player pianos. Several systems such as the Welte-Mignon, Duo-Art, and Ampico were incorporated. During the 1920s, Steinway had been selling up to 6,000 pianos a year. In 1929, Steinway constructed one double-keyboard grand piano. It has 164 keys and 4 pedals. (In 2005, Steinway refurbished this instrument).

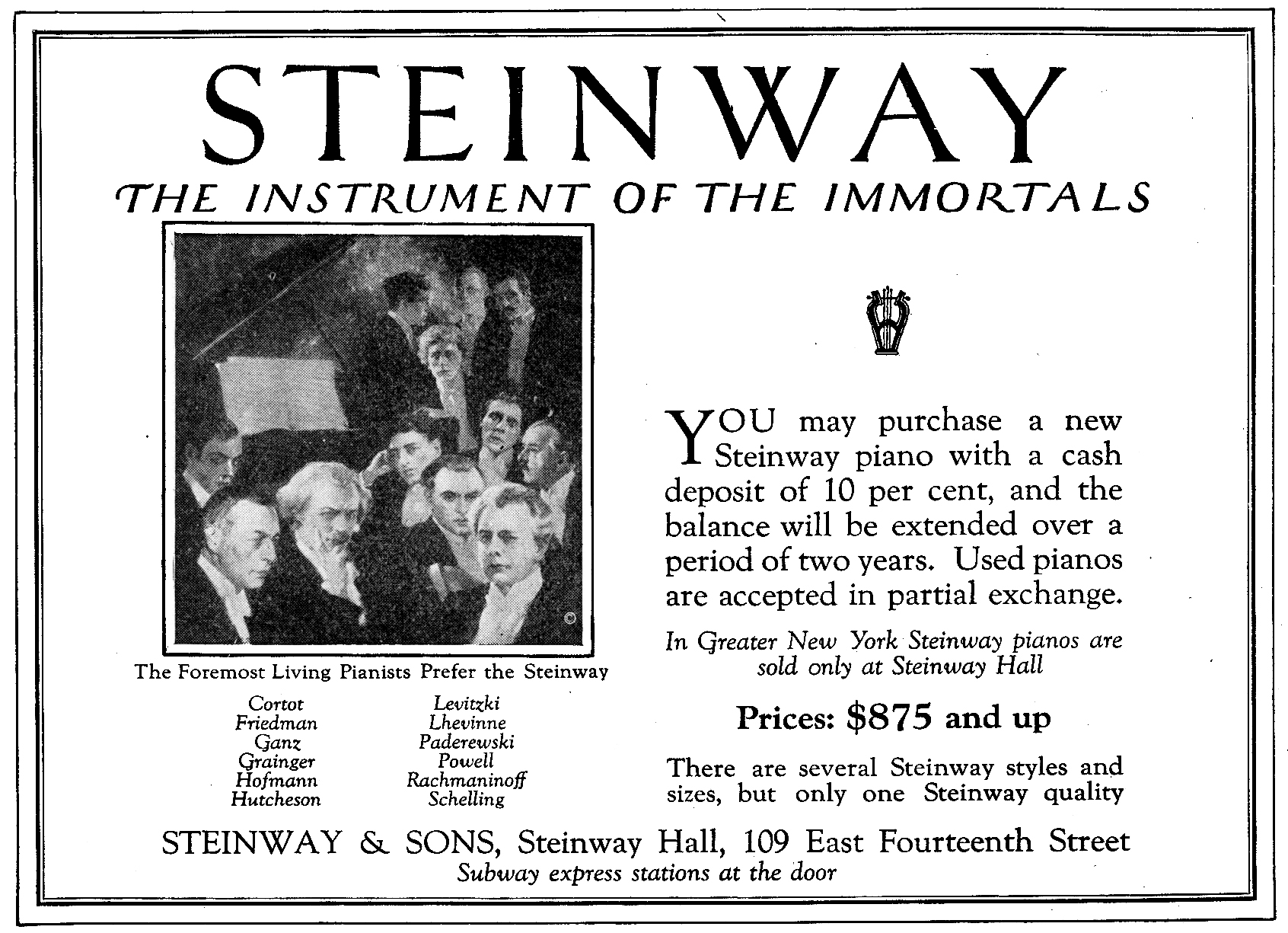
Steinway & Sons advertisement in 1922

During World War II, the Steinway factory in New York received orders from the Allied Armies to build wooden gliders to convey troops behind enemy lines. Steinway could make few normal pianos, but built 2,436 special models called the Victory Vertical or G.I. Piano. It was a small piano that four men could lift, painted olive drab, gray, or blue, designed to be carried aboard ships or dropped by parachute from an airplane to bring music to the soldiers.

The factory in Hamburg, Germany, could sell very few pianos during World War II. No more than a hundred pianos per year left the factory. In the later years of the war, the company was ordered to give up all the prepared and dried wood their lumber yard held for war production. In an air raid over Hamburg, several Allied bombs hit the factory and nearly destroyed it. After the war, Steinway restored the Hamburg factory with help from the Marshall Plan.

In the late 1960s, Steinway brought countersuit against Grotrian-Steinweg to stop them from using the name Steinweg on their pianos. Steinway won the case on appeal in 1975, forcing their competitor to use only the name Grotrian in the United States. The case set a precedent and established the concept of Initial Interest Confusion, in which consumers might be initially attracted to a similarly named but lesser-known brand because of the stronger brand's good reputation.

=== The 500,000th Steinway ===
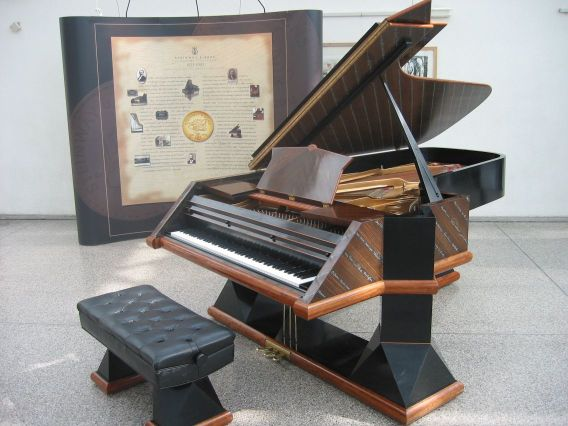
Steinway piano No. 500,000 from 1988

In 1988, Steinway made its 500,000th piano. Designed by artist Wendell Castle, it carries inscriptions of the names of the 832 pianists and 90 ensembles on the Steinway Artist roster of 1987, including Van Cliburn, Vladimir Horowitz and Billy Joel.

Six years later the company launched C. F. Theodore Steinway Academy for Concert Technicians, known simply as Steinway Academy, at Steinway's factory in Hamburg, Germany. There, experienced piano tuners and piano technicians from all over the world receive further training in piano tuning and maintenance. By 2000, Steinway had made its 550,000th piano.

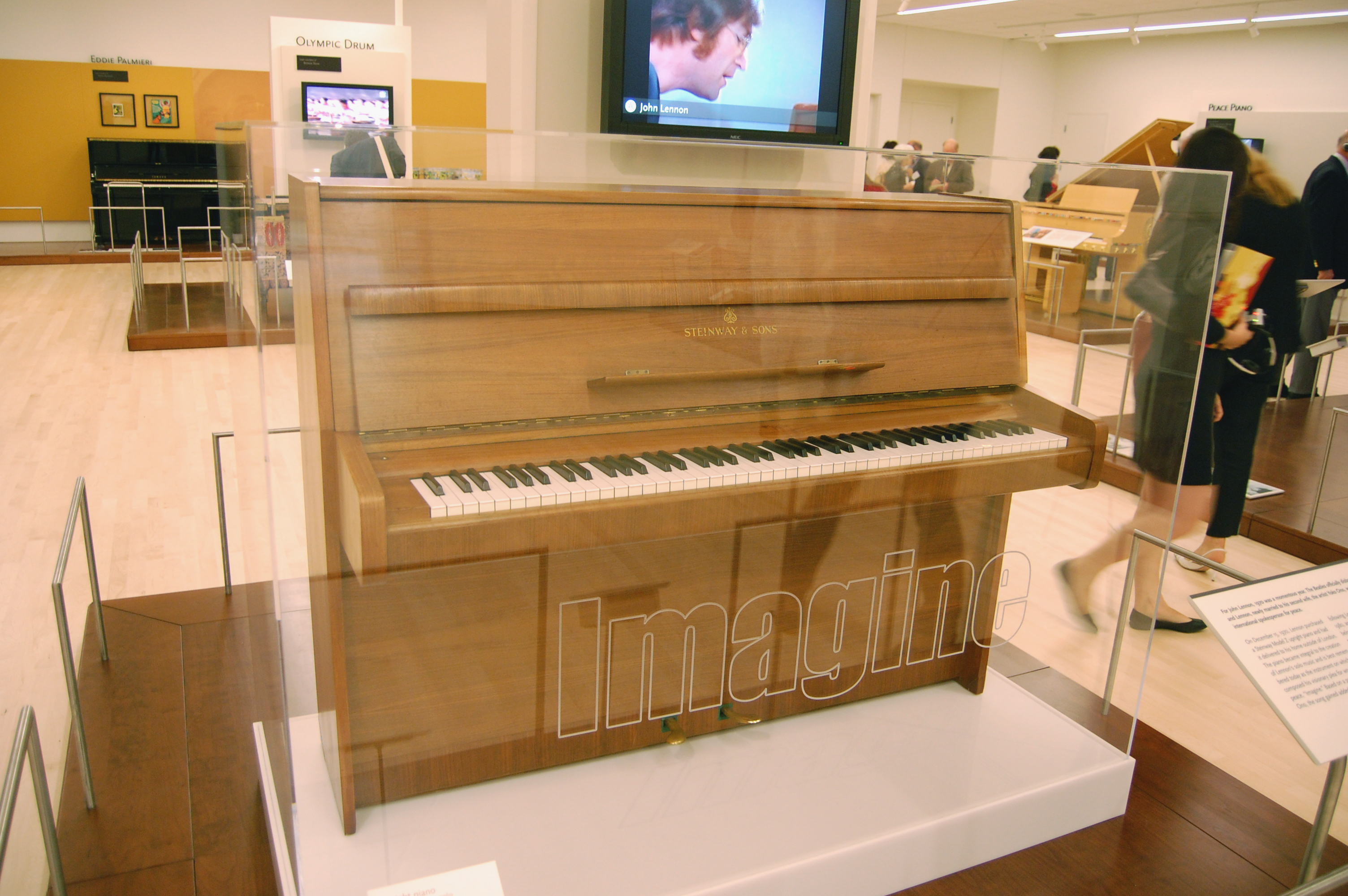
John Lennon's Steinway upright piano, used to write his 1971 song "Imagine", sold at auction to George Michael in 2000 for £1.67 million. It was subsequently used in the Imagine Piano Peace Project.

In 2003, Steinway celebrated its 150th anniversary at Carnegie Hall with a three-day concert series with performances by Peter Cincotti, Art Garfunkel, Herbie Hancock, Ben Heppner, Ahmad Jamal, Ramsey Lewis, Randy Newman, Roger Williams, Nancy Wilson, Yundi Li and Eroica Trio, among others. The first concert featured classical music, the second jazz, and the third pop. As part of the 150th anniversary, fashion designer Karl Lagerfeld created a commemorative Steinway limited edition grand piano.

In 2005, Steinway celebrated the 125th anniversary of the establishment of its factory in Hamburg, Germany. The celebration featured a concert at the Laeiszhalle concert hall in Hamburg with performances by Vladimir and Vovka Ashkenazy, Lang Lang, and Detlef Kraus. 1,800 people from 33 countries attended the concert. As part of the celebration, a 125th anniversary Steinway limited edition grand piano was designed by Count Albrecht von Goertz.

Until his death on September 18, 2008, at the age of 93, Henry Z. Steinway, the great-grandson of the Steinway founder, still worked for Steinway and put his signature on custom-made limited-edition pianos. At several public occasions, Henry Z. Steinway represented the Steinway family. He started at the company in 1937 after graduating from Harvard University. He was president of the company from 1956 to 1977 and was the last Steinway family member to be president of Steinway.

=== Changes in ownership ===
In 1972, after a lengthy strike, a long-running financial struggle, high legal expenses, and a lack of business interest among some of the Steinway family members, the firm was sold to CBS. At that time, CBS owned many enterprises in the entertainment industry, including electric guitar and amplifier maker Fender, drum maker Rogers, electro-mechanical piano maker Rhodes, and the baseball team New York Yankees. CBS had plans to form a musical conglomerate that made and sold music in all forms and through all outlets, including records, radio, television, and musical instruments. This new conglomerate was evidently not as successful as CBS had expected, and Steinway was sold in 1985, along with classical and church organ maker Rodgers and flute and piccolo maker Gemeinhardt, to a group of Boston-area investors led by Robert and John P. Birmingham. In order to acquire Steinway, the investors founded the musical conglomerate Steinway Musical Properties. In 1995, Steinway Musical Properties was acquired by Selmer Industries to form the musical conglomerate Steinway Musical Instruments.

In June 2013, private equity firm Kohlberg & Company offered to buy Steinway parent company Steinway Musical Instruments for $438 million. Two months later hedge fund Paulson & Co. Inc. made a higher offer, $512 million, to take the company private. The Steinway Musical Instruments board recommended that shareholders accept this, and in September 2013 Paulson announced completion of the acquisition.

=== Recent history ===
After the 2008 economic downturn, Steinway grand piano sales fell by half, and 30 percent of the union employees were laid off at the New York factory between August 2008 and November 2009. Sales were down 21 percent in 2009 in the United States. But sales began increasing a little in 2010, and they continued to improve the following year.

In 2015, Steinway went back to the player piano industry from around the 1920s by introducing a digital player piano series called Spirio. The technology in the Spirio pianos was created in 2007 by Wayne Stahnke, an Austrian engineer who has previously made digital player piano systems for other piano companies, like Yamaha and Bösendorfer. Wayne Stahnke's technology, originally called Live Performance Model LX, was sold to Steinway in 2014 and re-branded as Spirio. In contrast to player pianos by other brands available at the time, a recording option was not originally available in the Steinway Spirio. In 2018, a recording option was made available in Steinway Spirio pianos, known as the Spirio r. The Spirio technology is referred to as "non-parasitic", meaning that the recording and playback equipment do not interfere with the sound or feel of the piano. The pianist is recorded by over 20 grey-scale optical sensors mounted behind the piano’s keyboard. With over 1000 levels of sensitivity and the ability to record 800 measurements/second, they sense the speed at which the hammers strike the strings. In 2024, the Spirio library contained more than 4,000 recordings.

In 2015, Steinway made its 600,000th piano. The piano features the Fibonacci spiral and Macassar ebony veneer. It took 6,000 hours of work over 4 years to make, and was priced at $2.4 million.

As of early 2021, Paulson & Co. remains the ultimate parent of Steinway & Sons, with head office at 1251 Avenue of the Americas, New York, NY 10020.

== Models ==
Steinway pianos are sold by a worldwide network of around 200 authorized Steinway dealers who operate around 300 showrooms. The primary differentiation between Steinway models is simply their size (which is indicated by their model letter), which is also one of the most important indicators of their relative prices.

Steinway pianos are also sold in the secondary market. The price of a used Steinway can vary tremendously, depending on the model (size), age, condition, and the quality of any restoration work that has been done. Additionally, Steinway offers certified pre-owned pianos, using Steinway-approved parts.

=== Grands and uprights ===
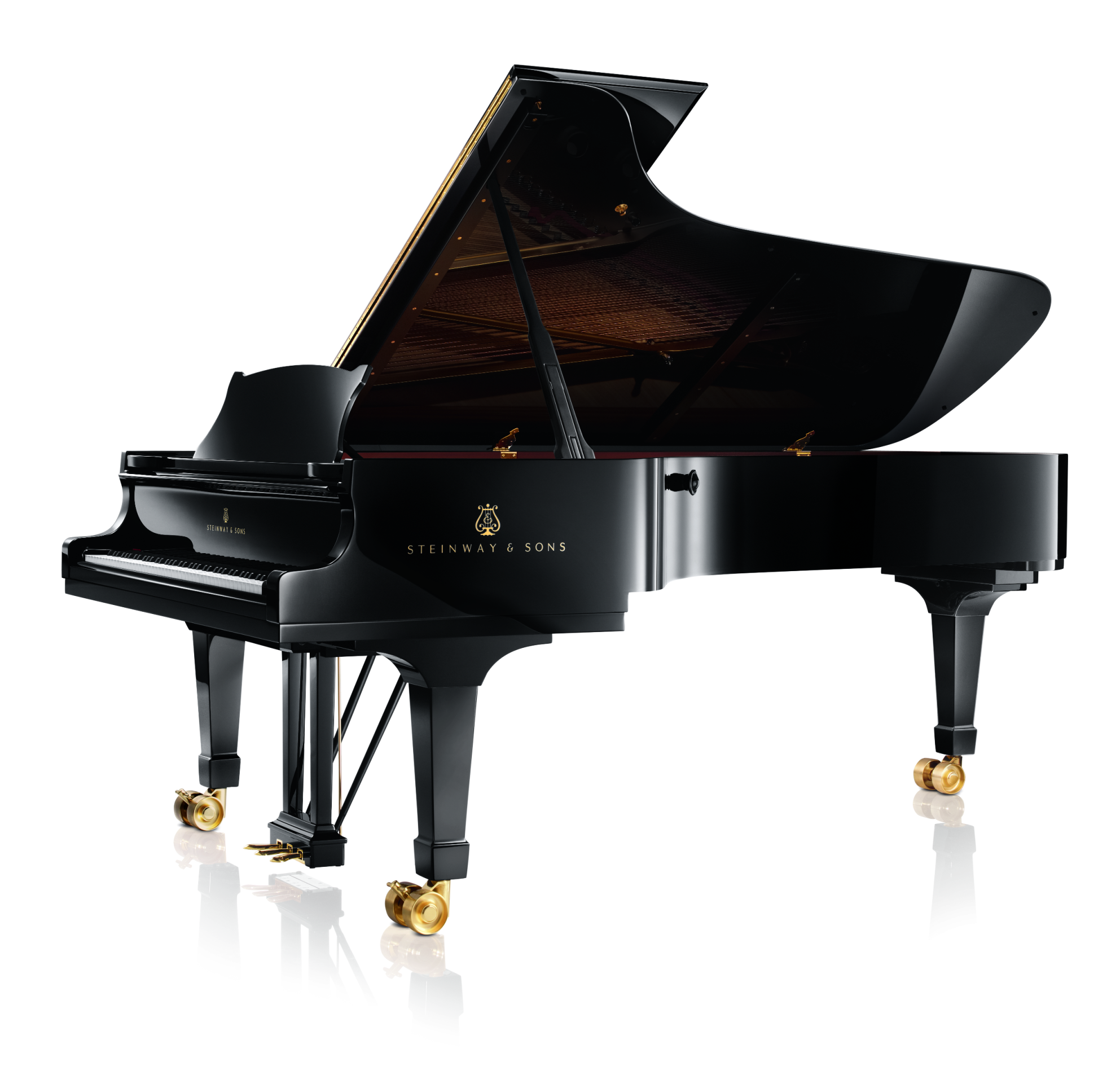
Steinway & Sons concert grand piano, model D-274, manufactured at Steinway's factory in Hamburg, Germany

Steinway makes the following models of pianos:

The Hamburg factory makes seven models of grand pianos and one model of upright piano. (The numerical portion of each model designation represents the length of the grand pianos and the height of the upright piano, in centimetres).

The New York factory makes six models of grand pianos and one model of upright piano.

=== Grand pianos ===
- Hamburg factory
  - S-155
  - M-170
  - O-180
  - A-188
  - B-211
  - C-227
  - D-274
- New York factory
  - S (5'1")
  - M (5'7")
  - O (5'10 3/4")
  - A (6'2")
  - B (6'11")
  - D (8'11 3/4")

A model L (5’ 10 1/2") was produced and sold as a replacement for the model O from 1922 to 2006.

=== Upright pianos ===
- Hamburg factory
  - K-132
- New York factory
  - K-52

Steinway has previously made upright pianos in different dimensions, such as the Model I/Model R. The Model 1098 "Professional Upright" was in production by 1953 and remained so until at least 2011.

=== Designer cases ===
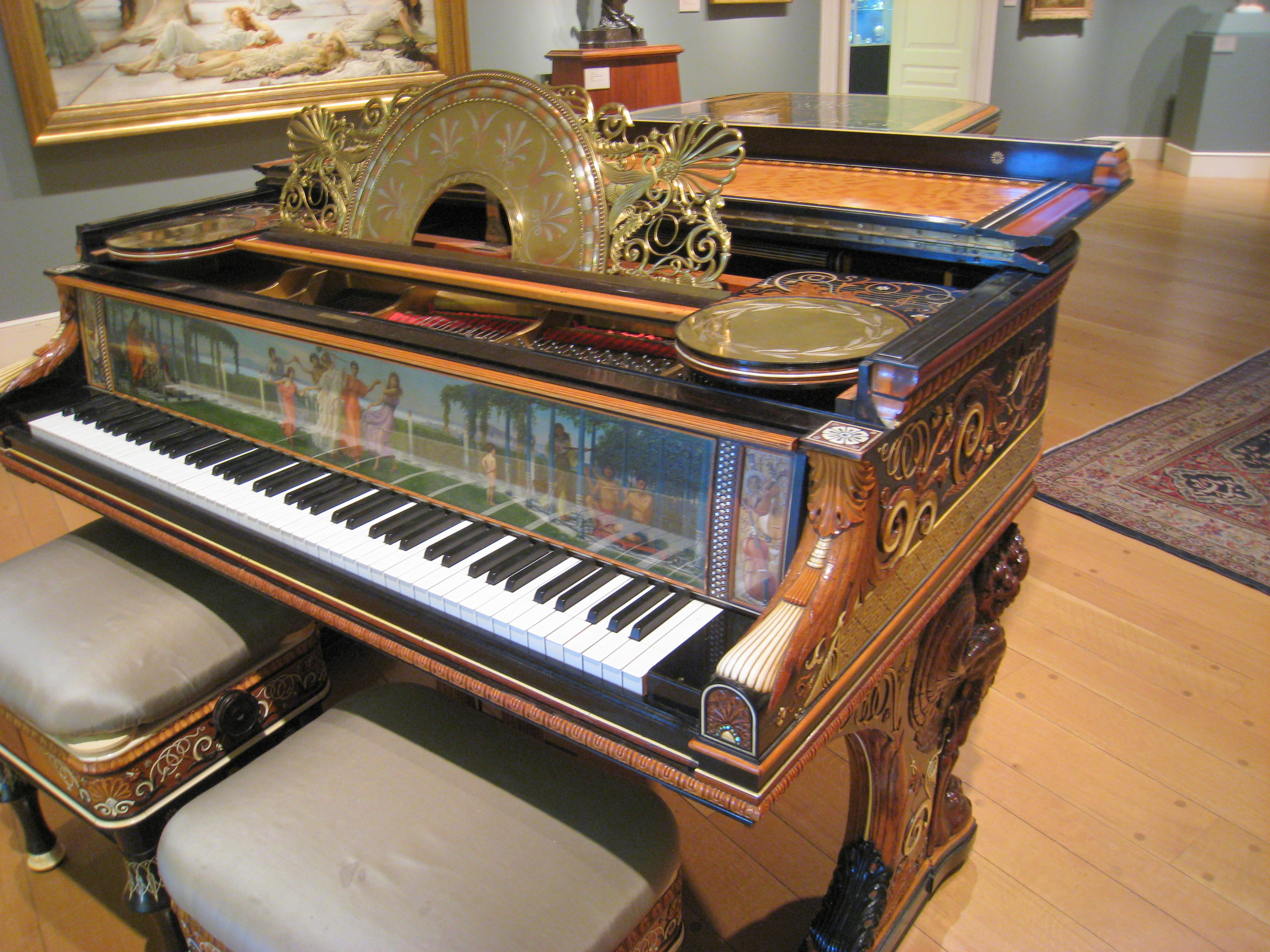
Steinway art case piano designed by Sir Lawrence Alma-Tadema on display at the art museum Clark Art Institute

Designers and artists such as Karl Lagerfeld, Dakota Jackson, Walter Dorwin Teague, Arthur Blackmore, Joseph Burr Tiffany, Louis Comfort Tiffany, Sir Lawrence Alma-Tadema, George Schastey, and the Herter Brothers have created original designs for Steinway pianos. These specially designed pianos fall under the art case piano line or the limited edition piano line.

Steinway began creating art case pianos in 1857 and the making of art case pianos reached its peak in the late 19th century. Today, Steinway only builds art case pianos on rare occasions. The art case pianos are unique. Some of Steinway's most notable art case pianos are the Alma-Tadema grand piano from 1887, the 100,000th Steinway piano from 1903, the 300,000th Steinway piano from 1938, and the Sound of Harmony from 2008. The Alma-Tadema grand piano was designed by Sir Lawrence Alma-Tadema and received great public acclaim when it was exhibited in London. The piano is made of ebony, inlaid with ivory and mother of pearl, with carved case, lid, and legs, and painted in the inside lid by artist Edward Poynter. It was bought by financier Henry Gurdon Marquand for his New York City mansion. In 1997, it was sold at Christie's auction house in London for $1.2 million, setting a price record for a piano sold at auction. It is now on display at the art museum Clark Art Institute. The 100,000th Steinway piano was given as a gift to the White House in 1903 and is made of cherry tree with gold leaf. It is decorated with coats of arms of the thirteen original states of America and painted by Thomas Dewing with dancing figures representing the nine Muses. The 100,000th Steinway piano was replaced in 1938 by the 300,000th Steinway piano. The gold gilded mahogany legs of the 300,000th piano are carved as eagles and are molded by sculptor Albert Stewart. The piano remains in use in the White House. The Sound of Harmony is decorated with inlays of 40 different woods, including the lid, which replicates artwork by Chinese painter Shi Qi. It took about four years to build the grand piano and it was priced at €1.2 million. The piano was chosen for use at the Expo 2010 Shanghai China.

In 1953 Steinway commissioned industrial designer Walter Dorwin Teague to design a special, limited-production model for the firm’s 100th anniversary. This “Centenary Grand,” with tapered, tubular legs, was finished in bleached mahogany highlighted by gold-toned metal accents on the lyre and legs. It was then advertised at $3415, while Steinway’s smallest grand piano was listed at $2625. Other examples of limited edition pianos have included The Steinway Limited Edition by Karl Lagerfeld created to celebrate the 150th anniversary of the Steinway company in 2003, and the 125th-anniversary grand piano by Count Albrecht von Goertz designed to celebrate the 125th anniversary in 2005 of the founding of the Steinway factory in Hamburg, Germany.

In 1993, Steinway introduced a new line of specially designed cases, the Steinway Crown Jewel Collection. The collection consists of grand and upright pianos in Steinway's regular models, but instead of the traditional black finish the pianos of the Steinway Crown Jewel Collection have veneers of rare woods from around the world. The collection includes Macassar ebony, East Indian rosewood, and kewazinga bubinga.

== Brands ==
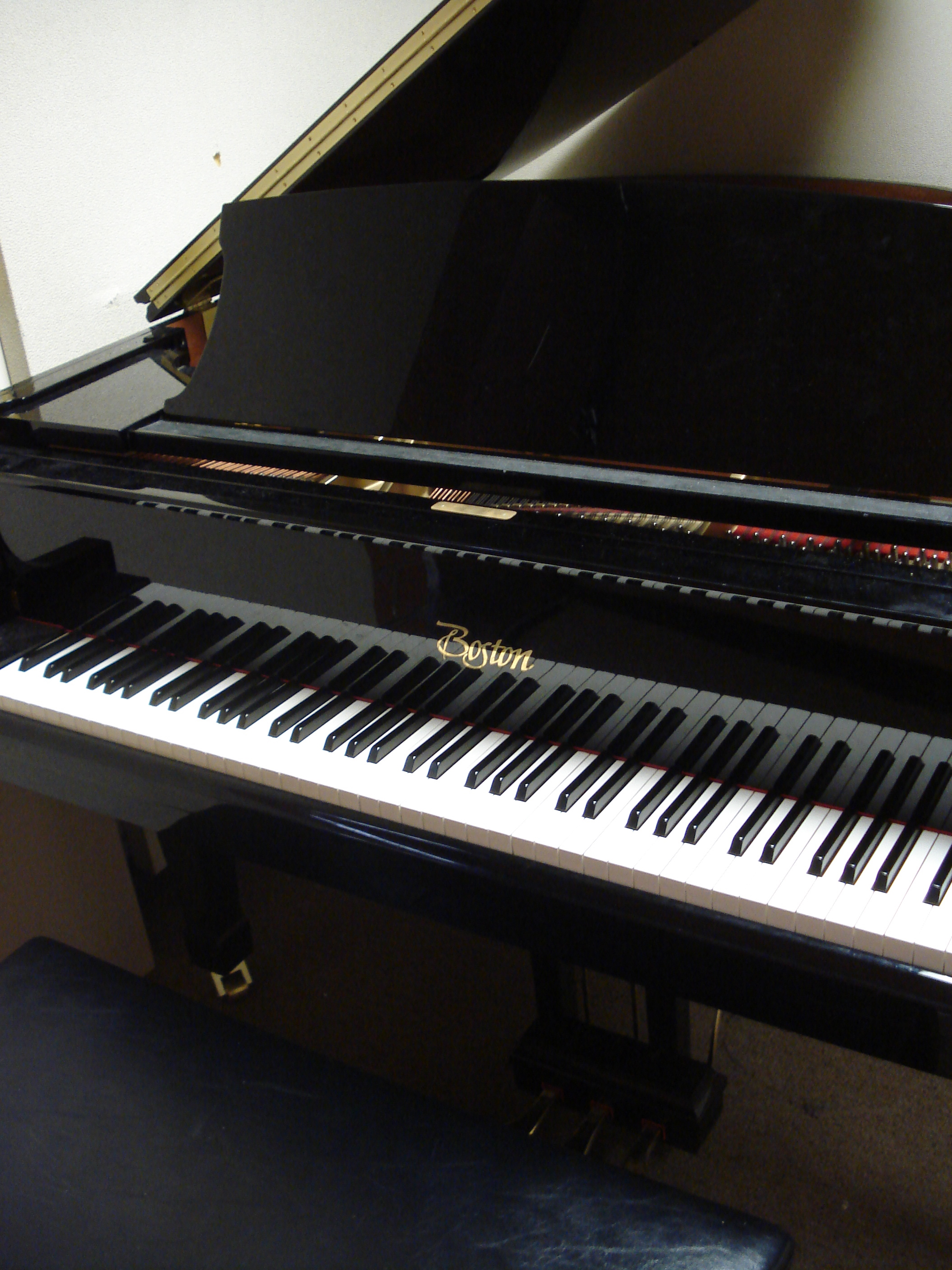
Boston grand piano

In addition to the Steinway & Sons brand, Steinway markets two other brands: Boston for the mid-level market and Essex for the entry-level market. Boston and Essex pianos are made using lower-cost components and labor. Pianos of these two brands, made with Steinway owned designs, are manufactured in Asia by suppliers. Steinway allows only its authorized Steinway dealers to carry new Boston and Essex pianos.

- Boston: made for the general mid-ranged piano market at lower prices than Steinway's name brand. Boston pianos are manufactured by Kawai Musical Instruments in Hamamatsu, Japan and Karawang, Indonesia. There are five sizes of Boston grand pianos and four sizes of Boston upright pianos available in a variety of finishes. Grand piano models are GP-156 PE, GP-163 PE, GP-178 PE, GP-193 PE, and GP-215 PE. Upright piano models are UP-118 PE, UP-120 PE, UP-126 PE, and UP-132 PE. Boston pianos incorporate some of the features of Steinway pianos such as a wider tail design (a feature of the Steinway piano models A-188, B-211, C-227, and D-274) resulting in a larger soundboard area than conventionally shaped pianos of comparable sizes, a maple inner rim, and Steinway's patented Octagrip pinblock.
- Essex: made for the entry-range market and is lower priced than Steinway and Boston pianos. Since 2005, Essex pianos are made at the Pearl River piano factory in Guangzhou, China. Prior to 2005, they were made by Young Chang in Korea. There are two sizes of Essex grand pianos and four sizes of Essex upright pianos available in a wide variety of finishes and furniture designs. Grand piano models are EGP-155 and EGP-173. Upright piano models are EUP-108, EUP-111, EUP-116, and EUP-123. Like the Boston pianos, Essex pianos incorporate some of the features of Steinway pianos as well: a wider tail design, an all-wood action with Steinway geometry with rosette-shaped hammer flanges, and reinforced hammers with metal fasteners.

== Piano bank ==
Steinway maintains a worldwide "piano bank" from which performing pianists, especially Steinway Artists, can select a Steinway piano with the touch and tonal characteristics they prefer for use in a certain concert, recording, or tour. Steinway prepares, tunes, and delivers the piano of the performer's choice to the designated concert hall or recording studio at the performer's expense.

The "piano bank" consists of approximately 250 Steinway pianos valued collectively at $12.5 million in 2019.

== Manufacture ==
=== German and American factories ===
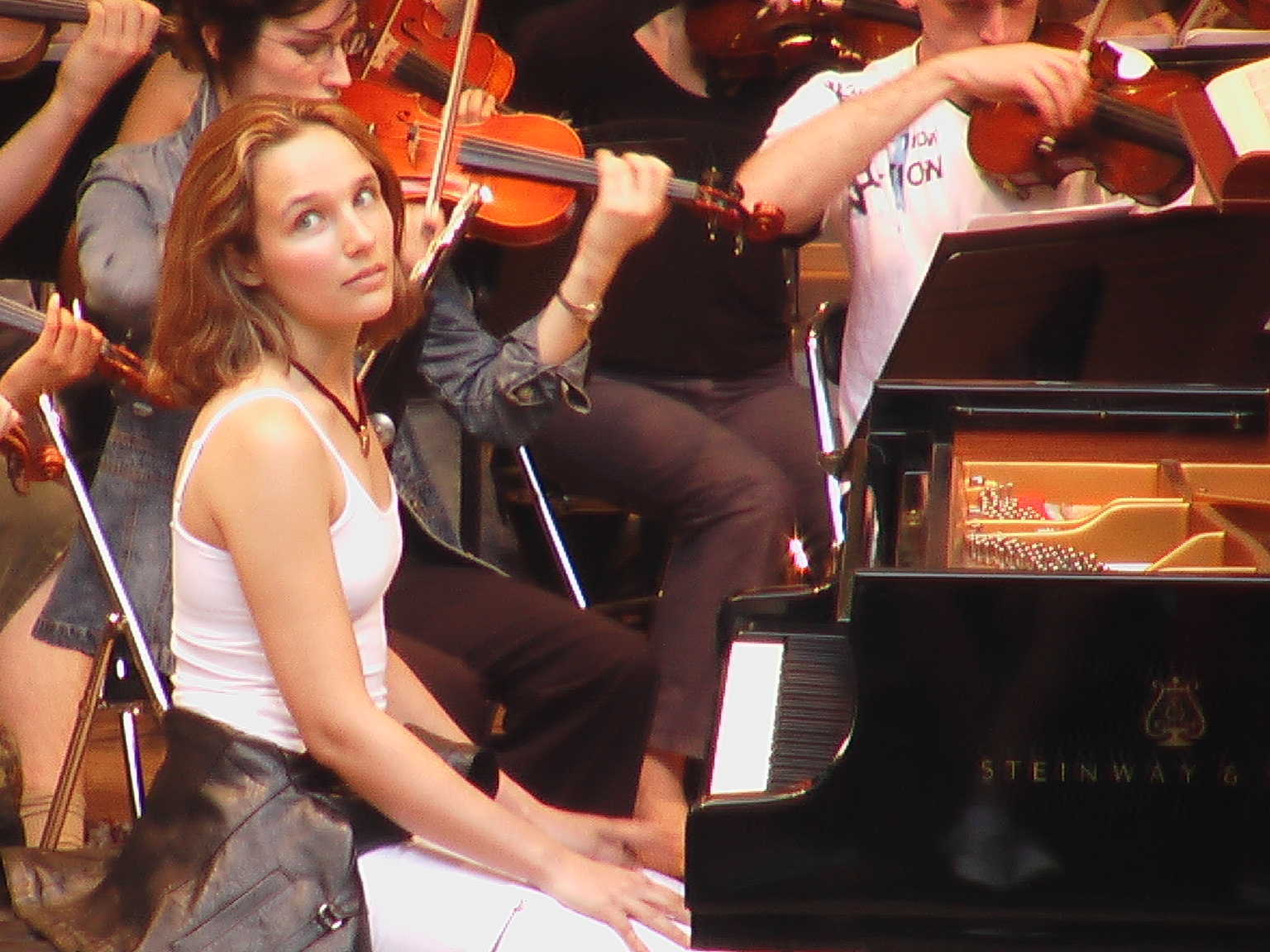
Hélène Grimaud at a Steinway grand piano made in Hamburg

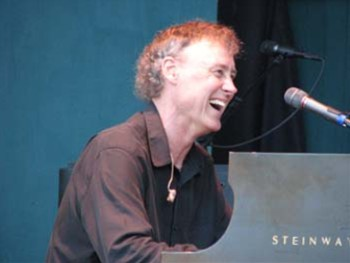
Bruce Hornsby at a Steinway grand piano made in New York

Some pianists and technicians have expressed a preference for pianos from Steinway's Hamburg factory over those made in New York, or vice versa. Emanuel Ax, concert pianist and piano teacher at the Juilliard School, has said that "... the differences have more to do with individual instruments than with where they were made." Larry Fine, American piano technician and author of The Piano Book, considers Hamburg Steinways to be of higher quality than those from New York. In 2010, the New York factory made some changes in its manufacturing processes and materials to improve quality, and Fine was invited to tour the factory to see some of the changes. Fine wrote in his Acoustic & Digital Piano Buyer of Spring 2011 that the changes have improved the quality of the New York pianos, but that the Hamburg pianos are still of higher quality.

Steinway has two sales areas: the factory in New York supplies North and South America, and the one in Hamburg supplies the rest of the world. At all main Steinway showrooms across the world, customers can order pianos from either factory. The Hamburg and New York factories exchange parts and craftsmanship, and the parts for both factories come from the same places: Canadian maple is used for the rim, and the soundboards are made from Sitka spruce from Alaska. Both factories use similar crown parameters for their diaphragmatic soundboards. To maintain quality, Steinway has acquired some of its suppliers. Steinway bought the German manufacturer Kluge in Wuppertal, which supplies keyboards, in December 1998, and in November 1999 purchased the company that supplies its cast iron plates, O. S. Kelly Co. in Springfield, Ohio.

A majority of the world's concert halls own at least one Steinway piano, and some (for example Carnegie Hall) have model D-274s from both the Hamburg factory and the New York factory to satisfy a greater range of preferences.

=== Components ===
External videos
- The New York Times: Where It's Made: A Steinway Grand Piano, 360-degree video of the making of Steinway pianos in the factory in Hamburg, Germany, November 15, 2017

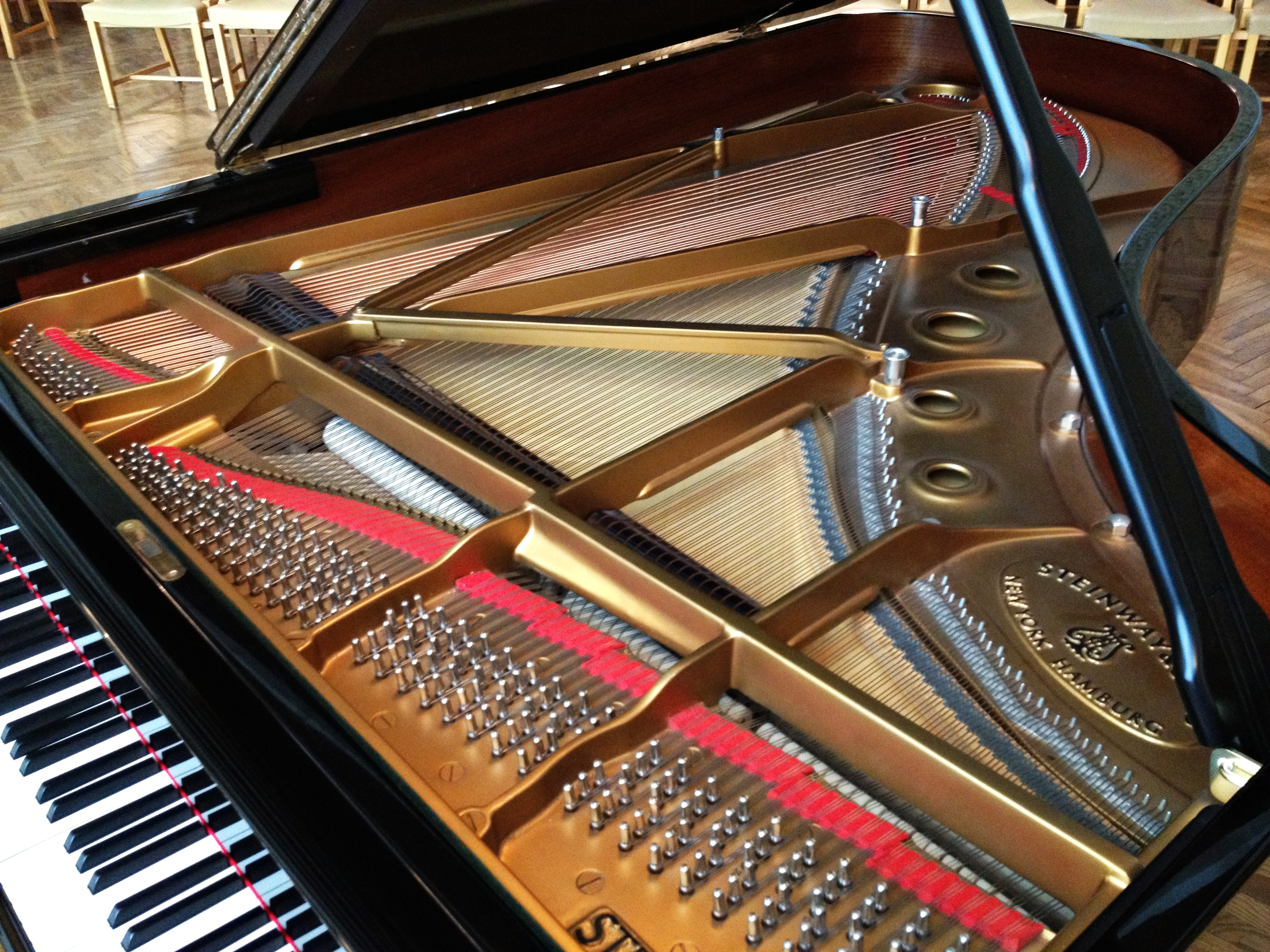
Interior of a Steinway grand piano showing the rim, plate, soundboard, bridges, keys, and strings

Each Steinway grand piano has more than 12,000 individual parts. A Steinway piano is handcrafted and takes nearly a year to build.

Steinway maintains its own lumber yards at both the Hamburg and New York factories, aging and drying lumber from nine months to five years. Less than 50 percent is finally used in the making of Steinway pianos. More than 70 percent of the walnut stock is discarded. The woods are purchased when they are available rather than when they are needed.

==== Rim ====
The rims of Hamburg-made Steinways are made of layers of hard rock maple and mahogany; the New York-made rims use layers of hard rock maple only. The layers are glued and pressed together into one piece in one operation using rim-bending presses that C. F. Theodore Steinway invented in 1880. After the rim-bending process, the rim has to rest from the stress of being bent. It is placed in a conditioning room for a month or more to reduce the moisture content of the wood to approximately six percent.

==== Plate ====
Inside the piano, a cast iron plate provides the strength to support the string tension, which ranges from 16 tons to 23 tons depending on the model. The iron plate is installed above the soundboard and is bronzed, lacquered, polished, and decorated with the Steinway logo. Steinway fabricates plates in its own foundry.

==== Soundboard and bridges ====
Steinway makes its soundboard from solid spruce, which allows the soundboard to transmit and amplify sound. The soundboard in Steinway pianos are double-crowned with Steinway's diaphragmatic design. The diaphragmatic soundboard, which was granted a patent in 1936, tapers in thickness from the center to the edges, which permits more freedom of movement resulting in a richer and more lasting tonal response.

Steinway bridges are made of vertically laminated hard rock maple with a hard rock maple cap. The bridges are measured for specific height requirements for each piano and are hand notched.

==== Keys and action ====
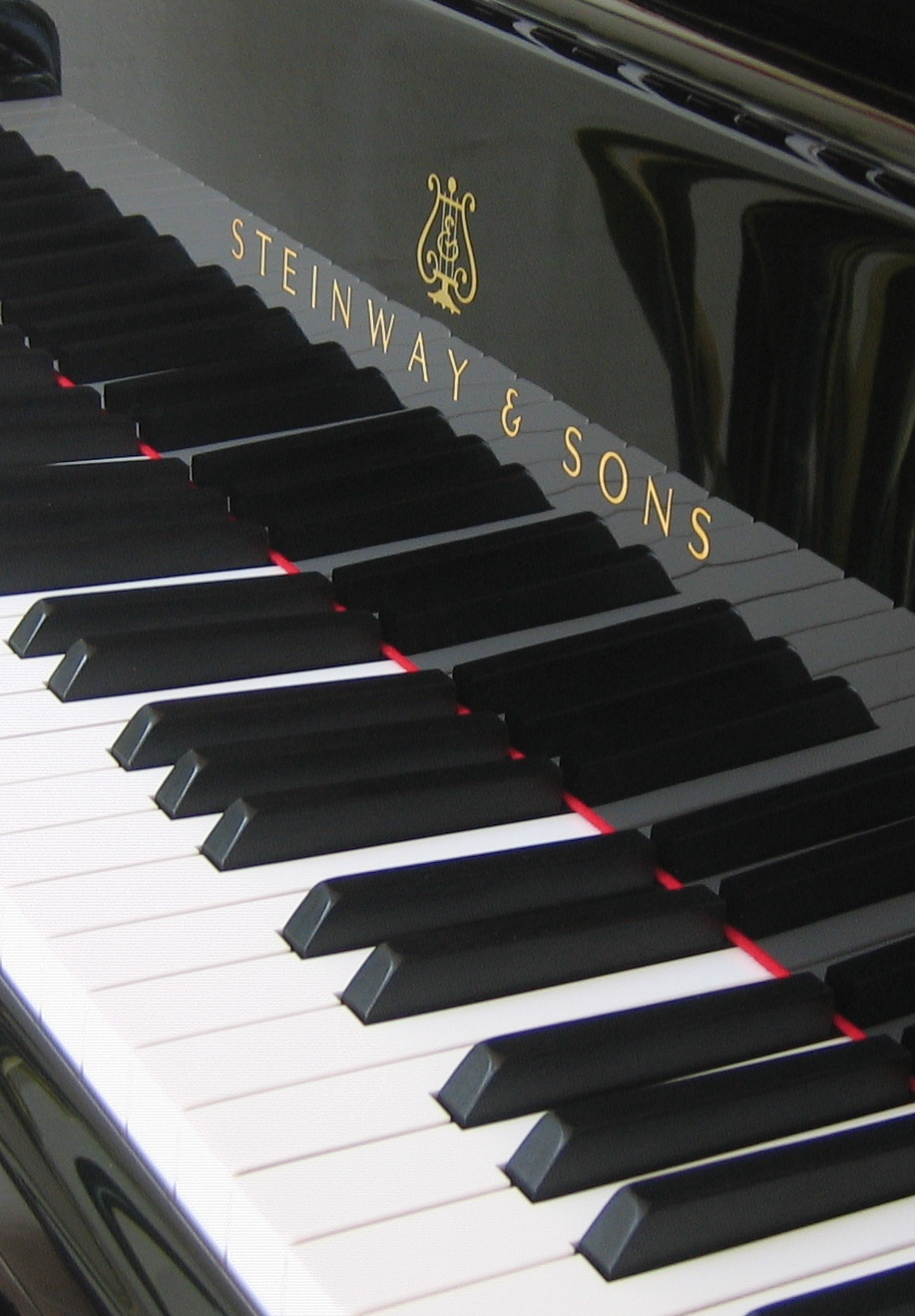
Keys of a Steinway grand piano

Steinway keys are made of Bavarian spruce. The surface of the white keys is made of polymer; earlier, they had been made of elephant ivory. Around the 1950s, Steinway switched from using ivory, and some years later use of ivory for piano keys was outlawed. The action parts are mounted on Steinway's tubular metallic frame. The Steinway hammers are cut from virgin wool felt, containing no admixture of other materials.

In 1962, the New York factory introduced the Permafree action for its grand pianos, using Teflon parts in place of cloth bushings. Using Teflon was less expensive for the company, was intended to withstand wear and humidity changes better than cloth, and eliminated the factory's reliance on a kind of cloth that might not be exactly the same from batch to batch. However, the Teflon bushings (which are relatively rigid and unaffected by humidity) were tightly installed inside parts made of wood, which does expand and contract according to humidity. This made the action become too tight or too loose, especially after changes in the weather, and caused annoying clicking noises while playing. The Teflon bushings were discontinued in 1983, and existing pianos that had them were retrofitted with cloth. The Hamburg factory never implemented the Teflon bushings in its pianos.

==== Strings and pinblock ====
The pianos have steel strings in the midsection and treble, with bass strings made of copper-wound steel. The strings are uniformly spaced with one end coiled around the tuning pins, which in turn are inserted in a laminated wooden block called the pinblock or wrestplank. The tuning pins keep the strings tight and are held in place by friction. Steinway also employs front and rear duplex scales, in which the main vibrating section of the string is augmented by a much smaller vibration in the two ends of the string which are fastened in place. Steinway was a friend of the German physicist Hermann von Helmholtz, and this friendship led to the development and Steinway patent in 1872 of front and back aliquots, allowing the traditionally dead sections of strings to vibrate in sympathy with the main string. The result is a fuller, more complex sound.

The pinblock, also known as wrestplank, in Steinways is made of seven layers of hard-textured wood that are glued together, set at a 45° angle to the run of the grain. It is designed to keep the piano in tune longer.

== Affiliates ==
=== Steinway Artists ===
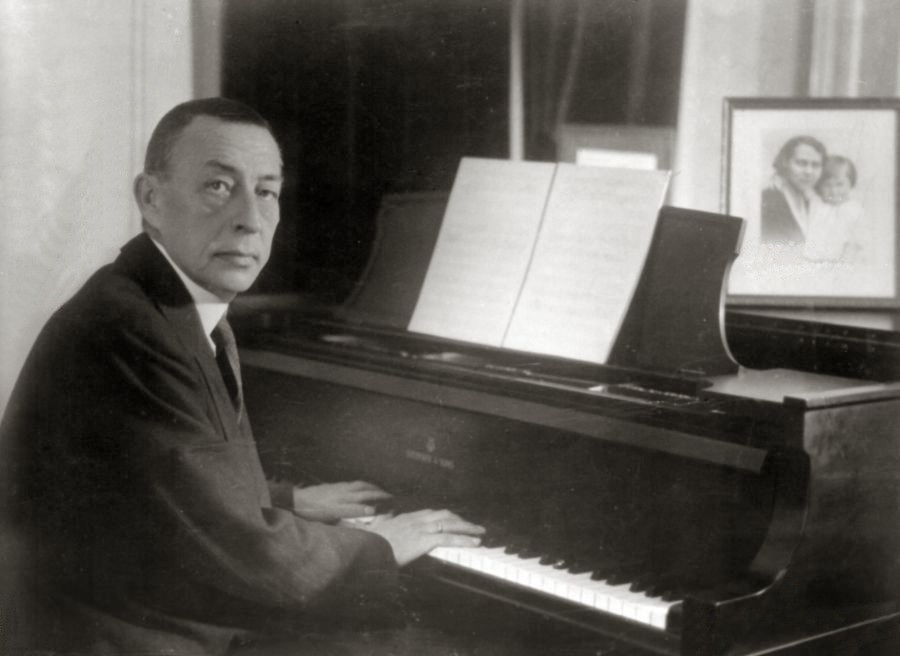
Sergei Rachmaninoff at a Steinway grand piano

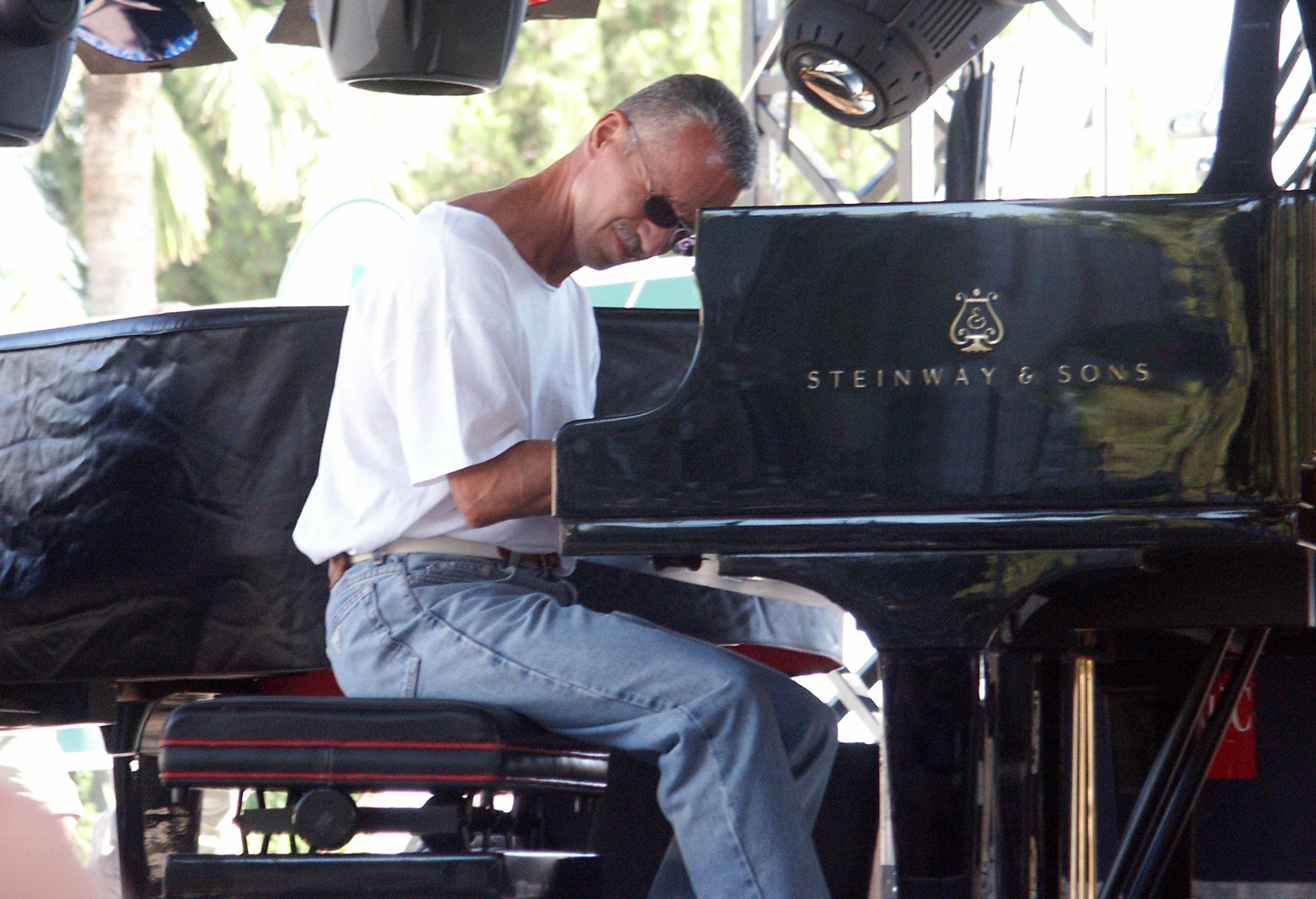
Keith Jarrett performing on a Steinway grand piano

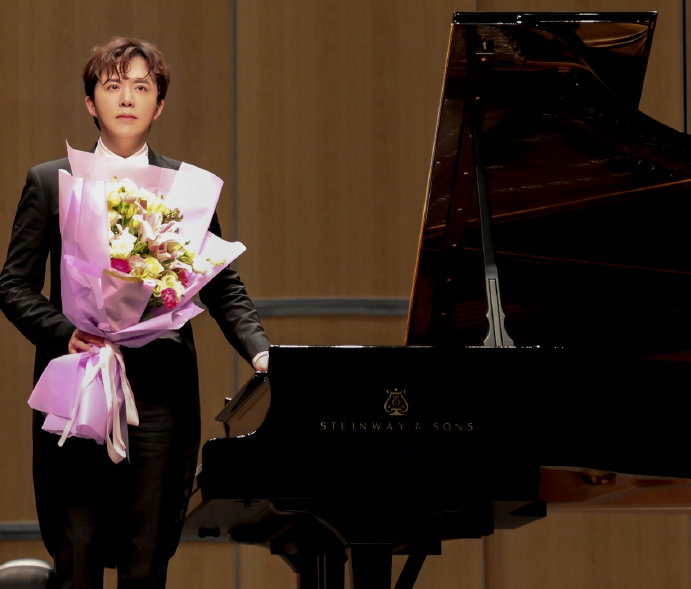
Yundi at a Steinway grand piano

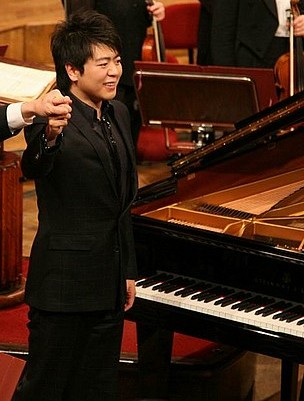
Lang Lang next to a Steinway grand piano

In contrast to other piano makers, who presented their pianos to pianists, William Steinway engaged the Russian pianist Anton Rubinstein to play Steinway pianos during Rubinstein's first and only American concert tour from 1872 to 1873, with 215 concerts in 239 days. It was a success for both Rubinstein and Steinway. Thus, the Steinway Artist program was born. Later the Polish pianist Ignacy Jan Paderewski toured America playing 107 concerts on Steinway pianos in 117 days.

As of October 2018, around 2,000 pianists worldwide are official Steinway Artists, which means that they have chosen to perform on Steinway pianos exclusively, and each owns a Steinway. None is paid to do so. Steinway Artists come from different genres: classical, jazz, pop, and rock. A few examples of Steinway Artists are Daniel Barenboim, Harry Connick Jr., Billy Joel, Evgeny Kissin, Diana Krall, Yundi Li and Lang Lang. Some examples of Immortal Steinway Artists are Irving Berlin, Benjamin Britten, George Gershwin, Vladimir Horowitz, Cole Porter, and Sergei Rachmaninoff.

Steinway expects Steinway Artists to perform on Steinway pianos where they are available and in appropriate condition. Artur Schnabel complained once that "Steinway refused to let me use their pianos [i.e., Steinway pianos owned by Steinway] unless I would give up playing the Bechstein piano – which I had used for so many years – in Europe. They insisted that I play on Steinway exclusively, everywhere in the world, otherwise they would not give me their pianos in the United States. That is the reason why from 1923 until 1930 I did not return to America. ... [in] 1933, Steinway changed their attitude and agreed to let me use their pianos in the United States, even if I continued elsewhere to play the Bechstein piano ... Thus, from 1933 on, I went every year to America." In 1972, Steinway responded to Garrick Ohlsson's statement that Bösendorfer was "the Rolls-Royce of pianos" by trucking away the Steinway-owned grand piano that Ohlsson was about to give a recital on at Alice Tully Hall in New York City. Ohlsson ended up performing on a Bösendorfer piano borrowed at the eleventh hour, and Steinway would not let him borrow Steinway-owned pianos for some time. Ohlsson has since made peace with Steinway. Angela Hewitt was removed from the Steinway Artist roster around 2002 after she purchased and performed on a Fazioli piano. After the Canadian pianist Louis Lortie was removed from the Steinway Artist roster in 2003, he complained in a newspaper article that Steinway is trying to establish a monopoly on the concert world by becoming "the Microsoft of pianos". A Steinway spokesman said, in response to Lortie's decision to perform a concert on a Fazioli piano, that Steinway does not want anyone on the Steinway Artist roster who does not want to play the Steinway exclusively.

According to musicologist Stuart de Ocampo, "That Steinway aggressively sought out and paid (in various forms) for artist endorsements must be stressed in order to combat an idealistic notion that the greatest flocked to Steinway simply because it was the best." More generally, Stuart de Ocampo endorses the view of Donald W. Fostle, who wrote in a company history of Steinway that "the genius of Steinways ... ultimately lay in their ability to persuade millions of persons across decades and continents that in this realm of supreme subjectivity, individual variation, incertitude, and ever-changing conditions, there was an absolute best. The assertion, repeated often enough, took on the coloration of fact", but Stuart de Ocampo concludes that "Innovations in piano construction carved out a unique sound for the Steinway pianos in the mid-nineteenth century. Medals at fairs and international exhibitions were the basis of Steinway & Sons' early reputation." Paying for pianists' endorsements back then was not specific to Steinway. As there were financial incentives for testimonials, several famous pianists had no qualms about endorsing more than one piano brand. Franz Liszt endorsed Steinway, Bösendorfer, Chickering, Erard, Ibach, Mason & Risch, and Steck at the same time. Today, no pianist is paid by Steinway, and when Steinway Artists loan pianos from Steinway for a concert or recording session the artists do have to pay Steinway for preparing, tuning, and delivering of the piano. According to management academic David Liebeskind, the Steinway Artist program "... is one of the only pure product endorsements programs, as no artist is paid to play on or endorse a Steinway piano."

The Steinway Artist program has been copied by other piano companies, but Steinway's program is unique in that a pianist must promise to play pianos of the Steinway brand only. The Steinway Artist designation restricts a pianist's use of pianos by other makers and implies an obligation to perform on Steinway pianos.

=== All-Steinway Schools ===
Logo of All-Steinway Schools

The All-Steinway School designation is given by Steinway to educational institutions of music in which not less than 90 percent of the pianos are designed by Steinway. Steinway does not offer the pianos free of charge but requires that the institutions buy them. Performance venues, teaching studios, and practice rooms for piano students must be equipped with Steinway pianos. Teaching studios and practice rooms for other students may be equipped with Boston or Essex pianos; some All-Steinway Schools have chosen to have Steinway pianos in these rooms also. It is required that the pianos are kept in performance-quality condition and All-Steinway Schools must have piano technicians who participate in Steinway's technical training programs. If the pianos are not maintained in performance-quality condition, Steinway can withdraw the All-Steinway School designation.

The Oberlin Conservatory of Music in Ohio holds the longest partnership with Steinway. They have used Steinway pianos exclusively since 1877, 24 years after Steinway was founded. In 2007, they obtained their 200th Steinway piano, a model D-274 manufactured at Steinway's factory in Hamburg, Germany. Other examples of All-Steinway Schools are the Yale School of Music at Yale University in Connecticut, the Curtis Institute of Music in Pennsylvania, Royal Holloway, University of London, the University of Melbourne Faculty of VCA and MCM in Australia, and the Central Conservatory of Music in Beijing.

In 2007, the Crane School of Music in Potsdam, New York, was added to the All-Steinway School roster, receiving 141 pianos in one $3.8 million order. In 2009, the University of Cincinnati – College-Conservatory of Music in Ohio became designated an All-Steinway School, based on a $4.1 million order of 165 new pianos, one of the largest orders Steinway has ever processed.

As of 2024, there are approximately 200 All-Steinway Schools around the world.

=== Piano competitions ===
Several international piano competitions use Steinway pianos. Since the Cleveland International Piano Competition chose to use only Steinway pianos in 1999, Steinway has been selected exclusively by such competitions as the Van Cliburn International Piano Competition in Fort Worth, Texas, the Gina Bachauer International Piano Competition in Salt Lake City, Utah, the International Johann Sebastian Bach Competition in Leipzig, Germany, the Queen Elisabeth Competition in Brussels, Belgium, the Ferruccio Busoni International Piano Competition in Bolzano, Italy, and the Long-Thibaud-Crespin Competition in Paris.

== Awards ==
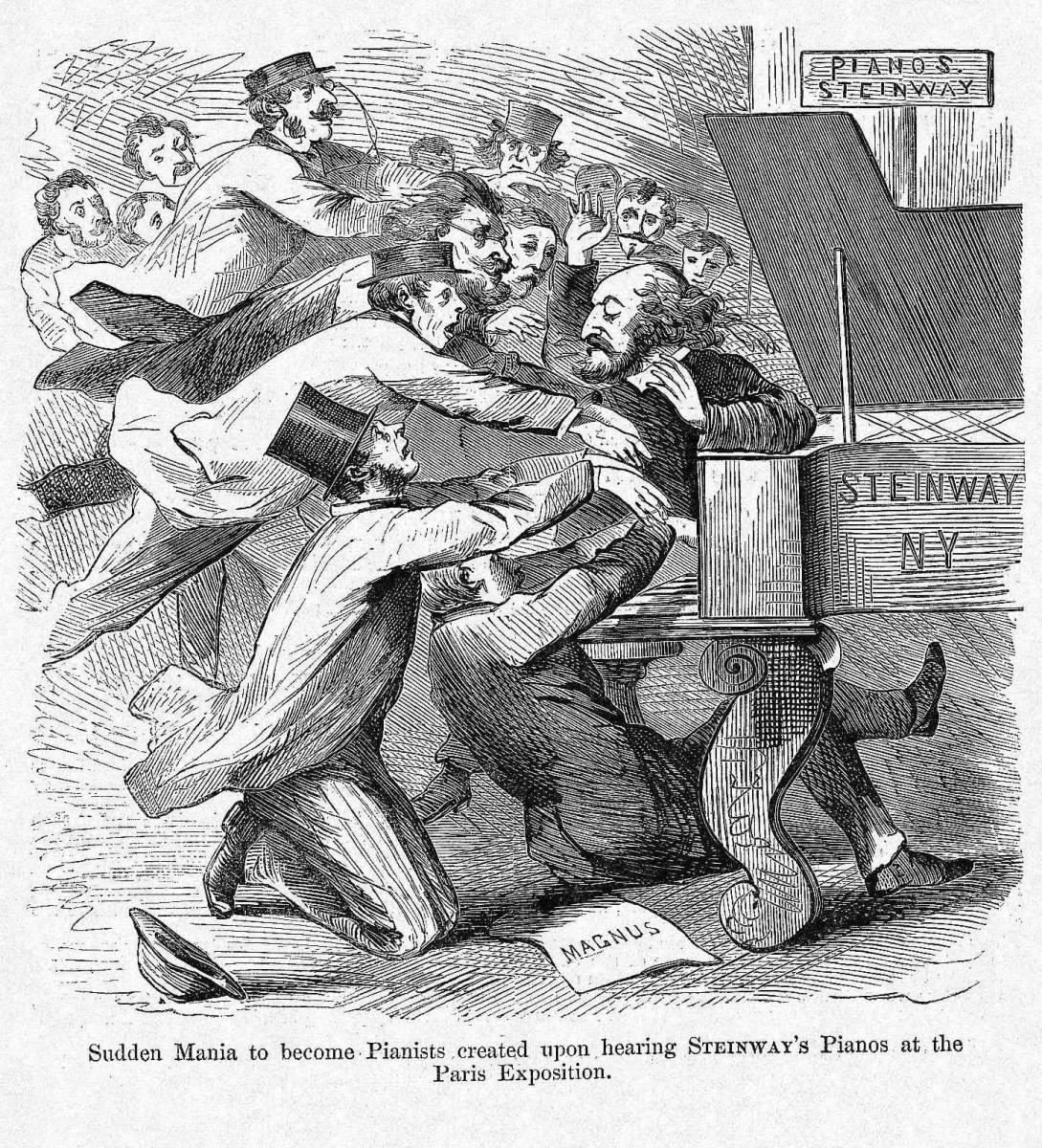
"Sudden Mania to become Pianists created upon hearing Steinway's Pianos at the Paris Exposition." This lithograph by Amédée de Noé conveys the popularity of the Steinway piano, the musicality of which had just been demonstrated by pianist Désiré Magnus at the 1867 Exposition Universelle in Paris. (Harper's Weekly, August 10, 1867, reporting on the world exposition).

The Steinway company and its leaders have won numerous awards, including:

- In 1839, Heinrich Engelhard Steinweg exhibited three pianos at the state trade exhibition in Braunschweig, Germany, and was awarded a gold medal.
- In 1855, Steinway attended the Metropolitan Mechanics Institute fair in Washington, D.C. and won 1st prize.
- In 1855, Steinway exhibited at the American Institute Fair in the New York Crystal Palace in what is now Bryant Park in New York City. Steinway won a gold medal. A reporter wrote the following about Steinway: "Their square pianos are characterized by the great power of tone, depth and richness in the bass, a full mellowness in the middle register and brilliant purity in the treble, making a scale perfectly equal and singularly melodious throughout its entire range. In touch, they are all that could be desired."
- From 1855 to 1862, Steinway pianos received 35 medals in the United States alone, since which time Steinway entered their pianos at international exhibitions only.
- In 1862, for the International Exhibition in London, Steinway shipped two square pianos and two grand pianos to England (two to Liverpool and two to London) and won 1st prize.
- In 1867, Steinway won three awards at the International Exposition in Paris: the Grand Gold Medal of Honor, the Grand Annual Testimonial Medal, and honorary membership of the Société Nationale des Beaux-Arts. These awards won in Europe increased the demand for Steinway pianos, thus the reason the family looked into opening a store in London. The International Exposition of 1867 established Steinway as the leading choice for pianos in Europe.
- In 1876, at the Centennial Exposition in the United States, Steinway received the two highest awards and a certificate of the judges showing a rating of 95.5 of a possible 96.
- In 1885, Steinway received the gold medal at the International Inventions Exhibition in London and the grand gold medal of the Royal Society of Arts in London.
- In 2007, the National Medal of Arts was awarded to Henry Z. Steinway and presented by US President George W. Bush in an East Room ceremony at the White House. Henry Z. Steinway received the award for "... his devotion to preserving and promoting quality craftsmanship and performance, as an arts patron and advocate for music and music education; and for continuing the fine tradition of the Steinway piano..."
- In 2014, Steinway received the Red Dot product design award for the Arabesque limited edition grand piano. The jury wrote: "The design of the Arabesque impresses through elegance and individuality. It thus excellently complements the high-class product line of this renowned manufacturing house."

== Patented inventions ==
Steinway's patent No. 229,198
of June 22, 1880

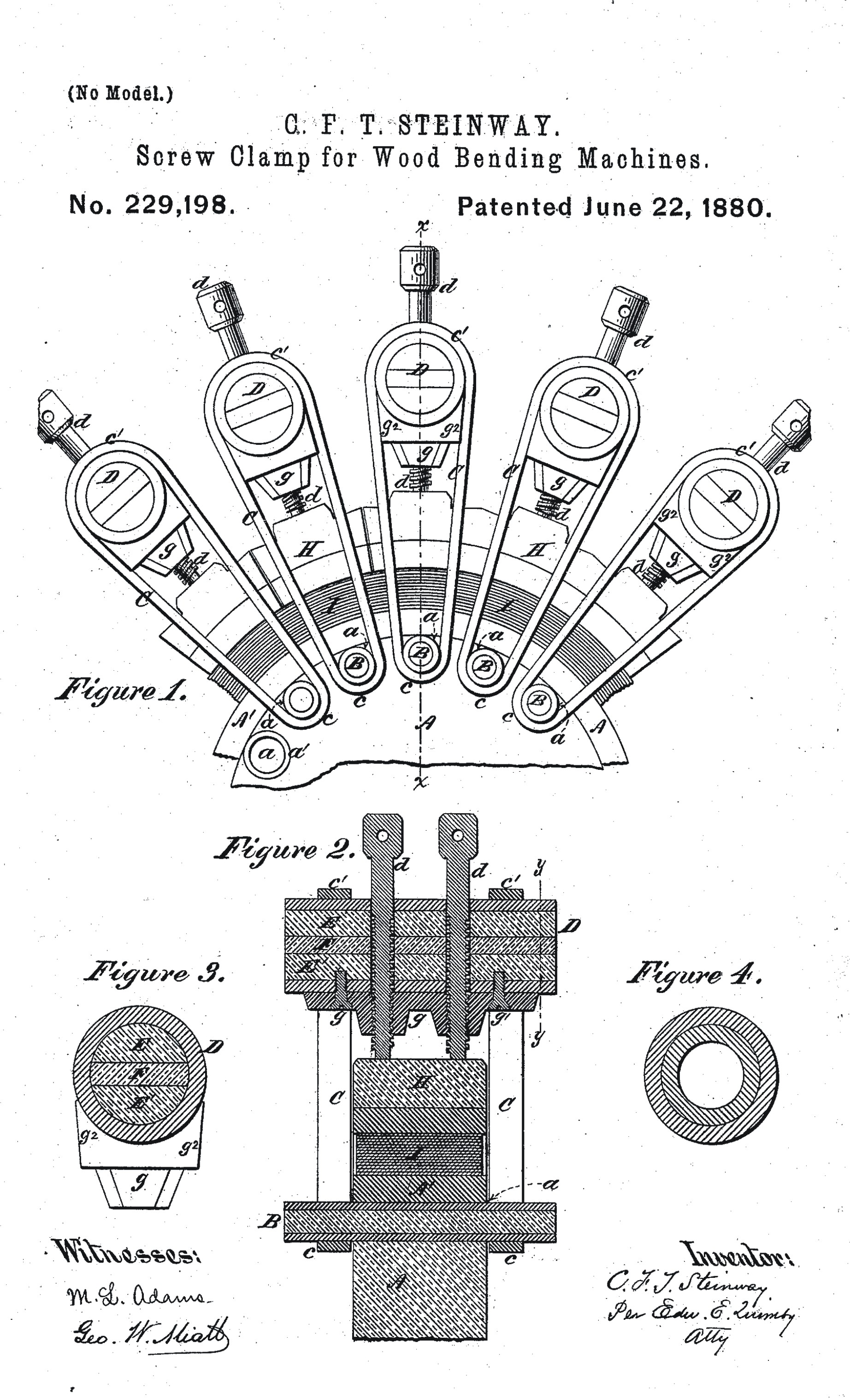
Blueprint for Steinway's patent No. 229,198, a tool for bending wood

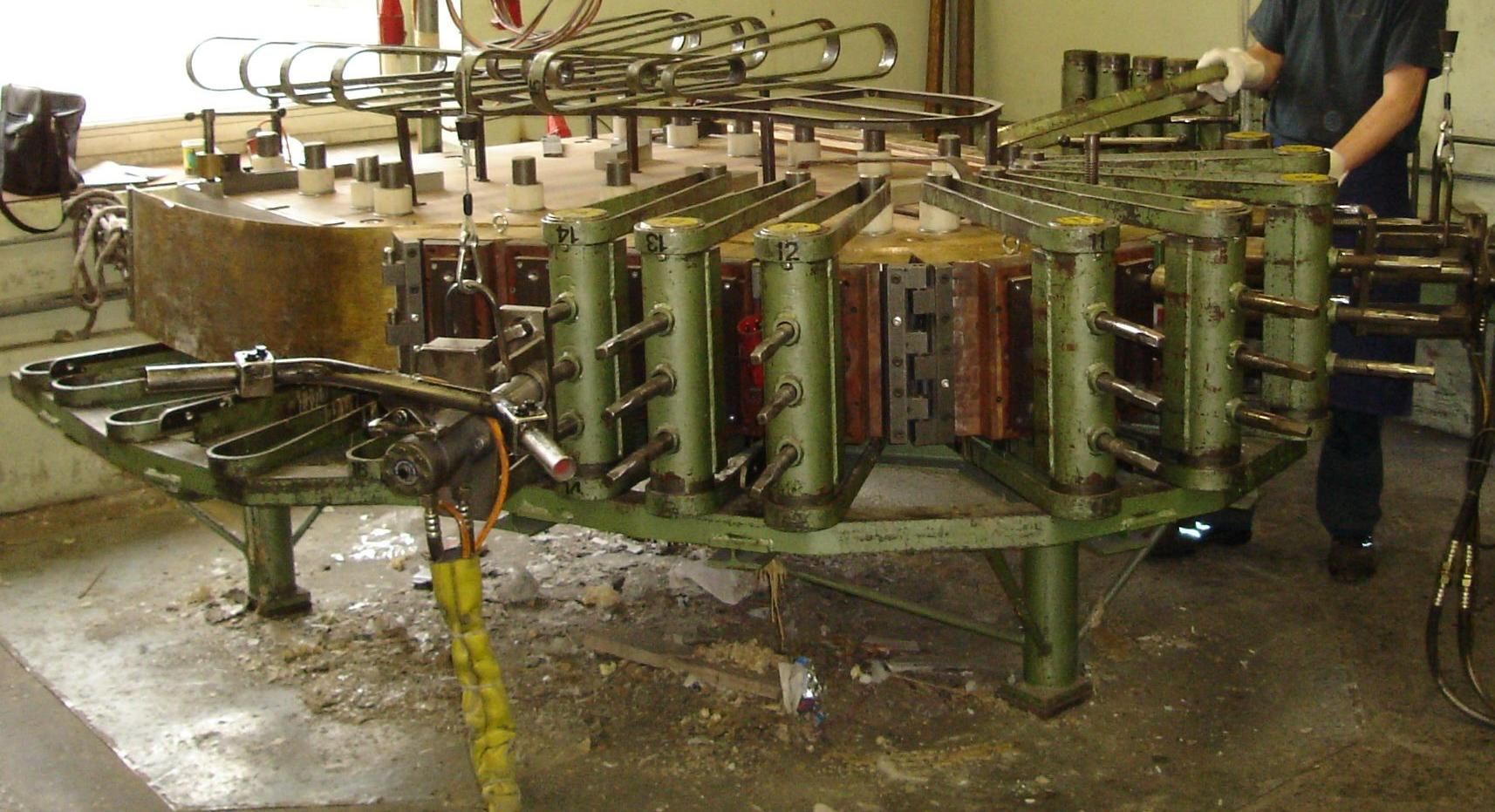
In action at Steinway's factory in Hamburg, Germany, 2006

Steinway has been granted 139 patents in piano making; the first in 1857. Some examples of these are:

- Patent No. 26,532 (December 20, 1859): The bass strings are "overstrung" above the treble strings to provide more length and better tonal quality. The invention won 1st prize medal at the 1862 International Exhibition in London. Today, the invention is a standard feature of grand piano construction.
- Patent No. 126,848 (May 14, 1872): Steinway invented the duplex scale on the principle of enabling the freely oscillating parts of the string, directly in front of and behind the segment of the string actually struck, also to resound. The outcome is a large range and fullness of overtones – one of the characteristics of the Steinway sound.
- Patent No. 127,383 (May 28, 1872): In a Steinway piano, the cast iron plate rests on wooden dowels without actually touching the soundboard. It is lightly curved, creating a large hollow between the plate and the soundboard. This cavity acts as a reinforcement of the resonant properties.
- Patent No. 156,388 (October 27, 1874): Steinway claims the invention of the middle piano pedal. The sostenuto pedal gives the pianist an ability to create what is called an organ pedal point by keeping a specific note's damper, or notes' dampers, in their open position(s), allowing those strings to continue to sound while other notes can be played without continuing to resonate. The sostenuto pedal was previously perfected, with a patent application, by M. Waldo Hanchett of Syracuse, New York. However, Steinway succeeded in patenting the device, despite Hanchett's five-months-old application.
- Patent No. 170,645 (November 30, 1875): Steinway's Regulation Action Pilot, also known as Capstan Screw, lifts the parts that drive the hammer toward the string. The Steinway device was easily adjustable, but more importantly allowed the action to be quickly separated from the keys, an advance that greatly simplified servicing the piano.
- Patent No. 233,710 (October 26, 1880): The bridge transmits the vibration of the strings to the soundboard. In a Steinway piano, the bridge consists of vertically glued laminations in a quartersawn orientation. With this continuity of grain, the sound traverses the bridge along its entire length, a principle that ensures that vibrations are easily developed and forwarded.
- Patent No. 314,742 (March 31, 1885): The rims of Hamburg-made Steinways are made of layers of hard rock maple and mahogany; the New York-made rims use layers of hard rock maple only. The layers are glued and pressed together into one piece in one operation.
- Patent No. 2,051,633 (August 18, 1936): The soundboard resembles a membrane. The special molding, gradually tapering from the center to the edge, provides great flexibility and freer vibration across the board.
- Patent No. 3,091,149 (May 28, 1963): A pinblock designed to keep the piano in tune longer. Seven layers of hard maple are glued together, each successive layer at a 45° angle to the one before it.

== Acquisitions ==
Acquisition date	Company	Business	Valuation millions USD	References
2019	Louis Renner GmbH	Piano actions, hammers and other parts	?	—
1999	Kluge Klaviaturen GmbH	Piano keyboards	?	—
1999	O.S. Kelly Co.	Foundry, piano plates	?	—

== Music ==
Steinway pianos have appeared in numerous records and concerts. A few examples include:

Ignacy Jan Paderewski performing on a Steinway grand piano waltz in C sharp minor, Op. 64, No. 2, composed by Frédéric Chopin. (Studio recording from 1917).

Sergei Rachmaninoff performing on a Steinway grand piano waltz in E flat major, Op. 18, composed by Frédéric Chopin. (Studio recording from 1921).

The White House's Steinway art case grand piano from 1938. Lin-Manuel Miranda (rapping) and Alex Lacamoire (piano) performing "The Hamilton Mixtape", composed by Lin-Manuel Miranda, at the White House Evening of Poetry, Music and the Spoken Word. (Concert recording from 2009).

Harry Connick Jr. and his band performing "When the Saints Go Marching In". Harry Connick Jr. plays on a Steinway grand piano. (Concert recording from 2010).
Problems listening to these files? See media help.

== See also ==
- Note by Note: The Making of Steinway L1037
- Pianomania
- Charles F. Tretbar
