= American Institute =

American Institute may refer to:

- American Institute of the City of New York, a civic organization c. 1828 – c. 1980
- American Institute in Taiwan, the de facto Embassy of the United States of America in Taiwan
