= Sound of Harmony =

Sound of Harmony is one of the world's most expensive grand piano, a Steinway & Sons art case piano built by Steinway's factory in Hamburg, Germany, in 2008 for €1.2 million. At the time it was the world's most expensive initial purchasing price for a piano, however it has since been overtaken by at least two other Steinway grand pianos: the Fibonacci Piano in 2015 and ‘Pictures at an Exhibition’ in 2017, both of which cost roughly twice as much as Sound of Harmony. It took Steinway about four years to build the piano. The piano is decorated with inlays of 40 different woods, including the lid which replicates artwork by Chinese painter Shi Qi. The piano is owned by the art collector Guo Qingxiang and was chosen for use at the Expo 2010 Shanghai China.
