= Victory Vertical =

World War II piano manufactured by Steinway & Sons

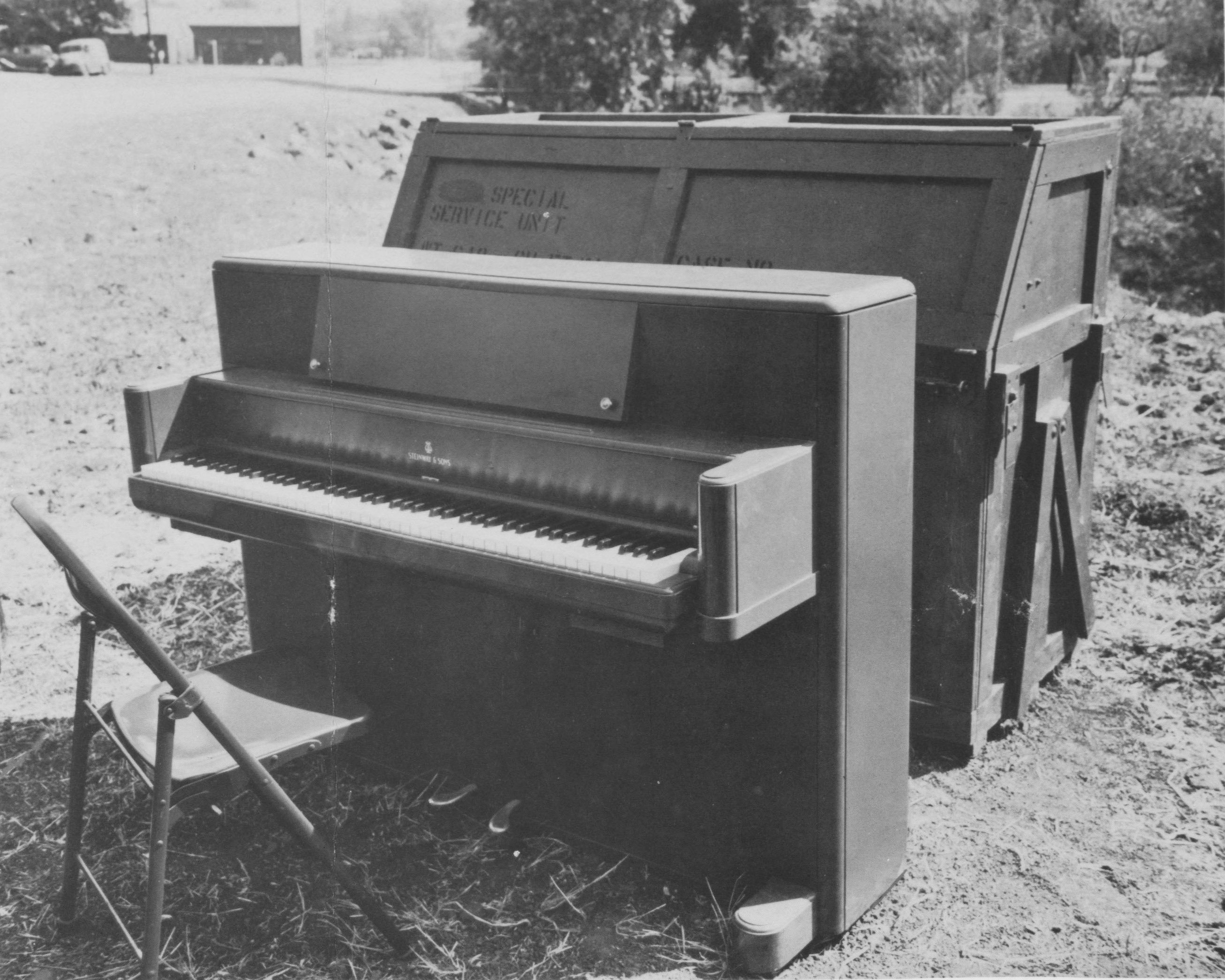
- The Victory Vertical piano with its transport box

Keyboard instrument
- Other names: G.I. piano, G.I. Steinway
- Classification: String
- Developed: 1940s during World War II

Builders
- Steinway & Sons

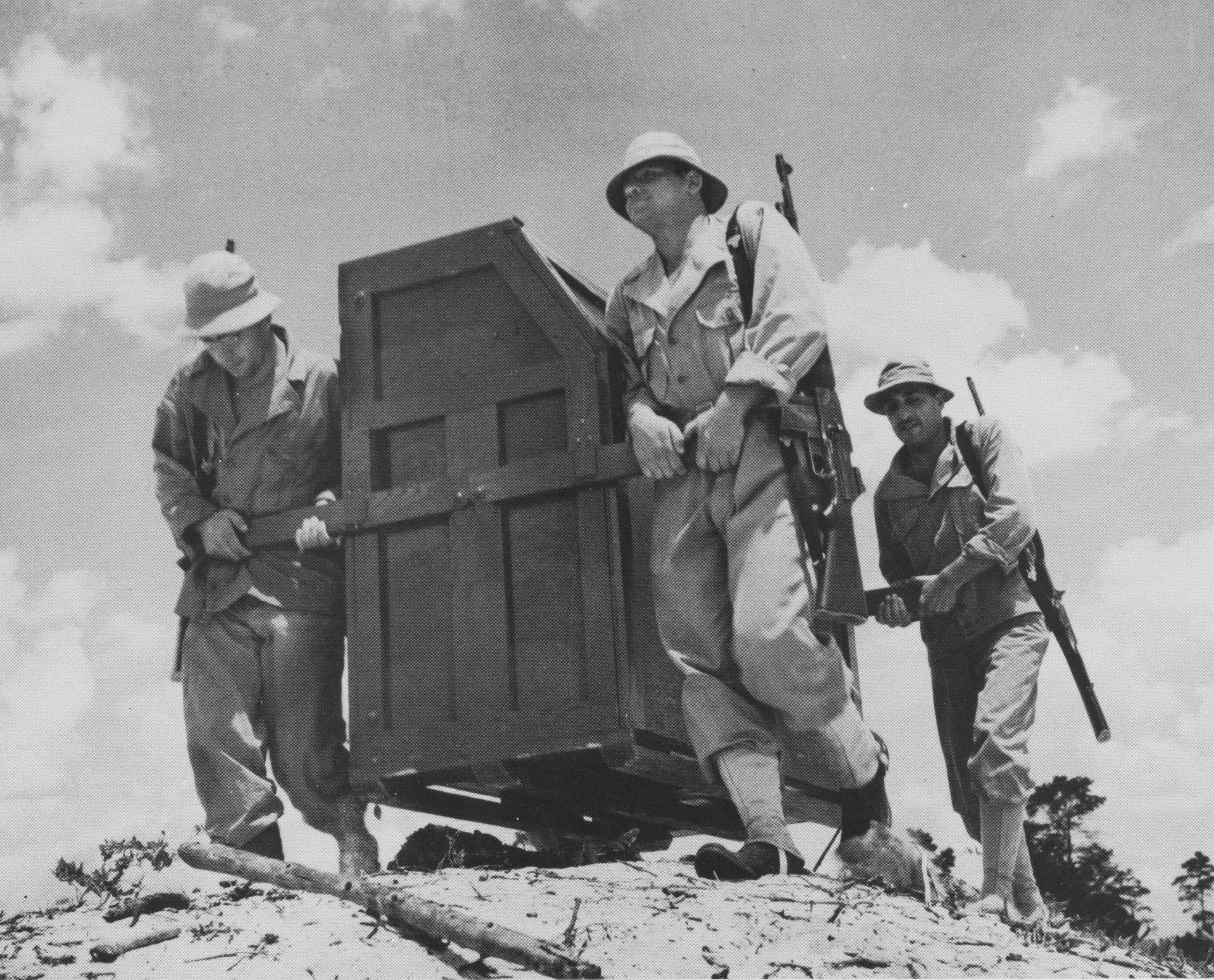
The Victory Vertical piano transported in its wooden box

The Victory Vertical, also known as the G.I. piano or G.I. Steinway, was a piano manufactured by Steinway & Sons for US troops in World War II. The company had been ordered to cease manufacture of pianos during the war, to reduce the use of war materials, but was asked in 1942 to produce a model suitable for use by the US military.

The Victory Vertical was designed to be robust and small enough to travel by aircraft or ship. Its construction used just 10% of the metal required by a traditional piano, and the components were designed for longevity. The piano was finished in olive drab, blue or grey paint depending on the arm of the military it was intended for. Some 2,436 were produced for military users and a similar number for approved civilian locations such as churches, schools and hotels.

== Background ==
Steinway & Sons are a German-American company with manufacturing plants in Queens, New York, and Hamburg, Germany. The outbreak of World War II led to restrictions at both plants. The Hamburg plant suffered from confiscation of its timber stocks by the Nazi government and production was restricted to around 100 pianos per year. The plant was all but destroyed during an Allied bombing raid towards the end of the war.

The Queens plant reduced outputs of pianos due to US government restrictions of the use of metals in musical instruments. Following the December 1941 entry of the US into the war the plant was ordered, in April 1942, to cease making pianos. The plant switched to manufacturing wings and tails for glider aircraft used to transport airborne troops and then to coffins.

== Piano ==
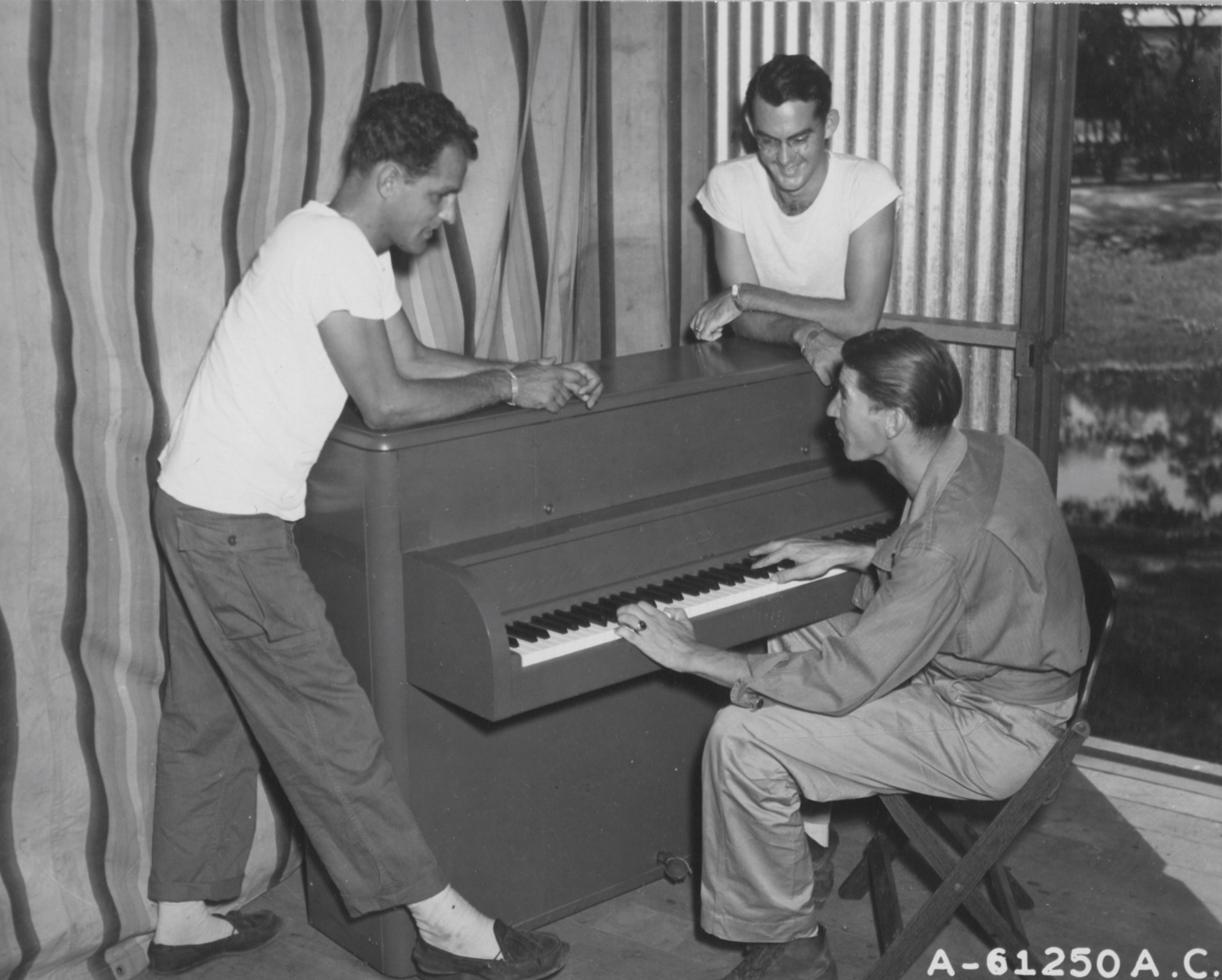
Air Force personnel gather around a Victory Vertical piano in Luzon, Philippine Islands, 1 June 1945. (U.S. Air Force Number A61250AC)

In June 1942 the War Production Board made a request to Theodore E. Steinway for the development of a robust piano model for use by the US military. The piano had to be small enough to be carried on a ship or parachuted from a plane and to be able to cope with the humidity of the South Pacific.

A prototype was designed by Theodore's son, Henry Z. Steinway and Roman de Majewski and completed in June 1942. The model, which became known as the Victory Vertical, was boxlike in appearance and 40 inches (1,000 mm) tall. With a weight of 455 pounds (206 kg), it was designed to be lightweight and could be carried by four men using handles fitted beneath the keybed. The piano had no legs, as these were thought to be too fragile to survive a parachute drop. To improve longevity celluloid keys were substituted for the usual ivory and the bass strings were covered with a soft iron instead of the usual copper. The piano contained just 10% of the quantity of metal used in traditional construction, minimising the use of important war materials. The glue used in the Victory Vertical was resistant to water and the whole was treated with insecticide. The piano cost less than $500 to manufacture.

The piano was approved and an initial order was placed for 405 models. Eight months later a follow-on order was made for an additional 800 and by the time production ended in 1953 some 2,436 had been shipped to the US military. Those intended for the US Army received "three coats of olive drab lacquer, slightly dulled" while others in blue or grey went to the Navy, Marine Corps, Army Air Corps and Coast Guard. The Victory Vertical was used in all theaters of the war and could fit in the bomb bay of a Boeing B-17 Flying Fortress.

The government granted Steinway permission to produce Victory Verticals for civilian settings such as churches, schools and hotels that were deemed to be "approved essential users". In total around 5,000 pianos were produced. Surviving models are known to exist in Iowa, Alabama, Tennessee and Michigan.
