= American Institute of the City of New York =

American civic organization (1828–1980)

- The American Institute of the City of New York for the Encouragement of Science and Invention
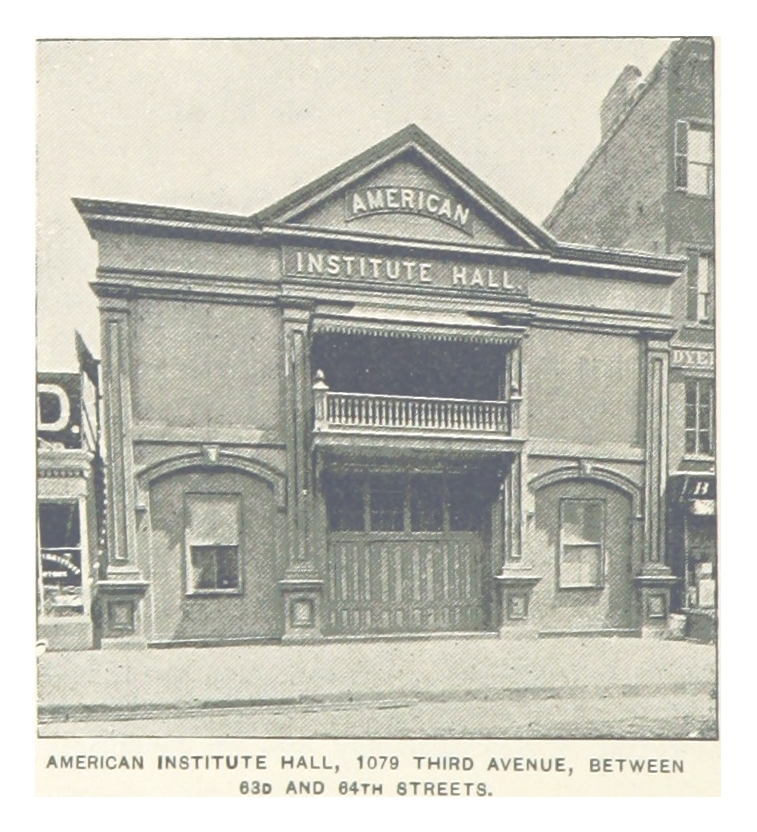
- American Institute Hall, 1079 Third Avenue, c. 1890
- Merged into: New York Academy of Sciences
- Established: May 2, 1829; 197 years ago
- Dissolved: 1980s
- Type: Civic organization
- Purpose: Inventions
- Headquarters: American Institute Hall, 1079 Third Avenue (between 63rd & 64th streets)
- Location: New York City (Manhattan), United States
- Products: American Institute Fairs (1829–1897)
- Services: exhibitions, lectures and radio broadcasts
- Publication: Science Observer (1939–1941)
- Awards: American Gold Medal Award; American Silver Medal Award; American Bronze Medal Award

The American Institute of the City of New York (or The American Institute of the City of New York for the Encouragement of Science and Invention) was a civic organization that existed from c. 1828 – c. 1980.

The institute was an association of inventors. It organized exhibitions, lectures and radio broadcasts to inform the public about new technologies, and served as a locus for inventors' professional activities.

The American Institute of the City of New York was chartered on 2 May 1829. Eventually, the American Institute was merged with the New York Academy of Sciences (NYAS) in the 1980s.

The New-York Historical Society received 105 boxes of materials for safekeeping in the 1940s. A detailed index is available at the New-York Historical Society of the contents of each box. Additional materials were given to the New-York Historical Society by Mr. Kenneth Weissman, a trustee and officer of "The Institute" at the time of the merger with the NYAS.

== History ==
A statistical library was established in 1833 and by 1839 had 4,000 titles.

The following description of the American Institute was published in the 1905 New International Encyclopedia

The institute was founded on February 18, 1828, and its American Institute fairs attracted wide attention from investors and capitalists. Among the inventions which received early recognition from the institute were the McCormick reaper, the sewing machine, Colt's fire-arms, the type revolving and double power printing press machines, the first anthracite coal burning stove, the Morse telegraph, the Beach Pneumatic Transit, the stocking loom, the telephone, and the Francis metallic lifeboat and lifesaving appliances. In the early 20th century, the American Institute was organized as five sections: The Farmers' Club, the Henry Electrical Society, the Horticultural Section, the Photographic Section, and the Polytechnic Section. It had a scientific library of over 15,000 volumes.

The institute published a magazine Science Observer from 1939 to 1941.

As opposed to Franklin Institute in Philadelphia, the Institute in New York promoted adoption of tariffs to protect domestic manufacturing.

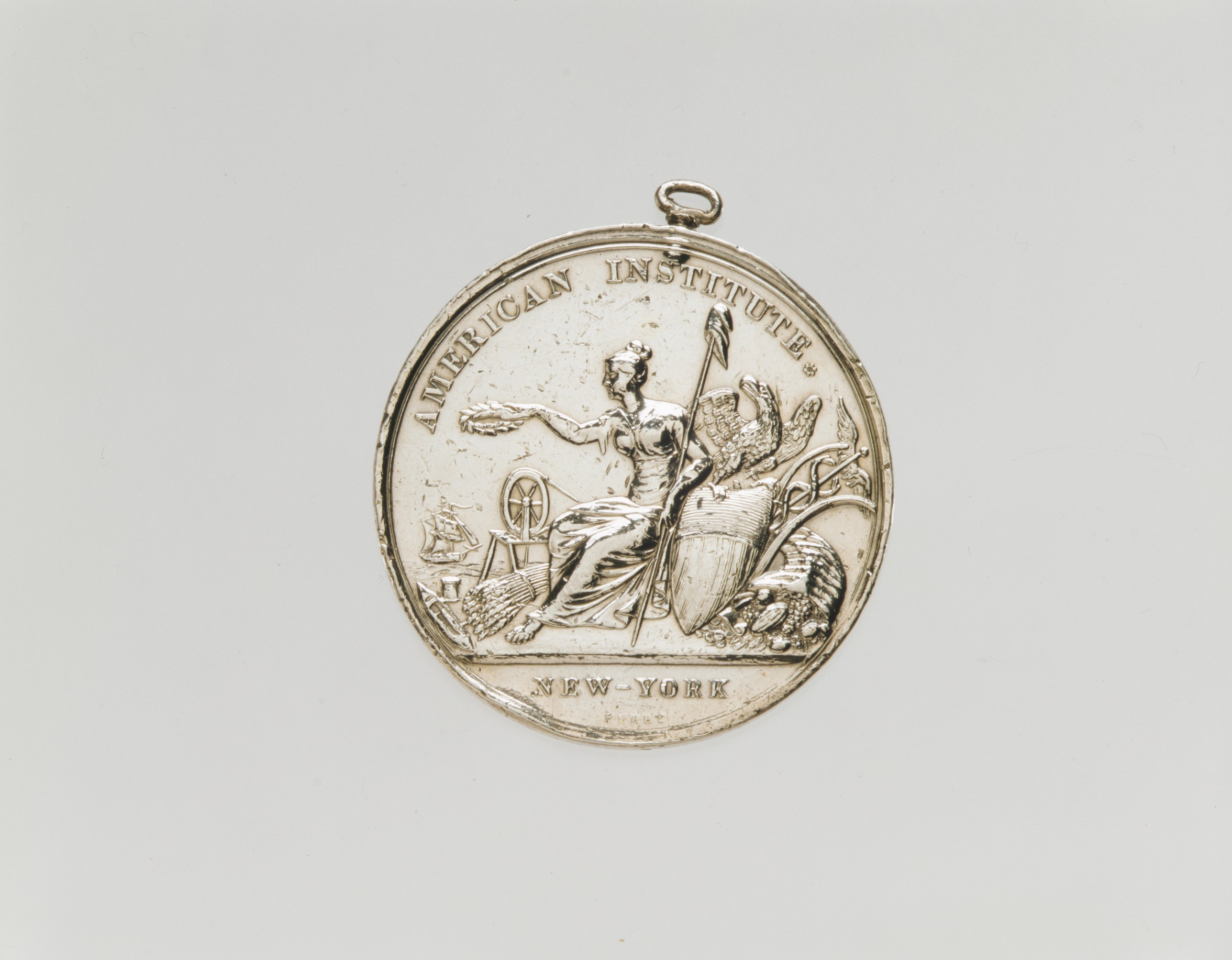
American Institute (Silver) Award Medal c. 1938

At one time Guldens mustard had a copy of the American Gold Medal Award on the jar label. Medals were issued in gold, silver and bronze for more than 150 years.

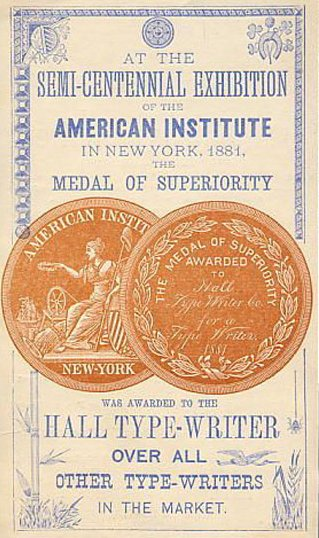
American Institute 1881
