= American Institute Fair =

Annual event held by the American Institute (1829–1897)

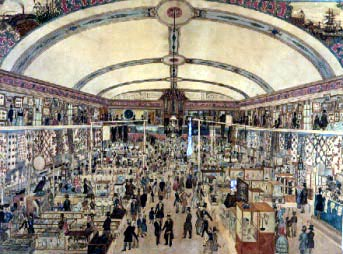
Image of Annual Fair of the American Institute at Niblo's Garden c. 1845 by Benjamin Johns Harrison

The American Institute Fair was held annually from 1829 until at least 1897 in New York City by the American Institute. The American Institute was founded in 1829 "for the encouragement of agriculture, commerce, manufactures, and the arts." The fair is sometimes considered the first world's fair in the United States, though it was fairly small by later standards, drawing about 30,000 attendees per year. It was held at Niblo's Garden in New York before being moved to the Crystal Palace in New York.

"At these fairs were displayed the finest products of agriculture and manufacturing, the newest types of machinery, the most recent contributions of inventive genius...[the fairs] served a two-fold purpose: that of playing the part of demonstrator to the public and that of furnishing an incentive to the exhibitors, both through competition and through the desire to win the very liberal awards and premiums."
