= For the Night =

2020 single by Pop Smoke featuring Lil Baby and DaBaby

Single by Pop Smoke featuring Lil Baby and DaBaby

from the album Shoot for the Stars, Aim for the Moon
- Released: October 3, 2020
- Recorded: 2020
- Genre: Hip hop; trap; soul
- Length: 3:10
- Label: Victor Victor; Republic
- Songwriters: Bashar Jackson; Dominique Jones; Jonathan Kirk; Alex Petit; Christoffer Marcussen; Michael Dean; Cedric Leutwyler
- Producers: CashMoneyAP; Palaze; Mike Dean

Pop Smoke singles chronology
"Mood Swings" (2020)	"For the Night" (2020)	"What You Know Bout Love" (2020)

Lil Baby singles chronology
"Why Do You Lie to Me" (2020)	"For the Night" (2020)	"Pardon" (2020)

DaBaby singles chronology
"Levitating" (2020)	"For the Night" (2020)	"Nah Nah Nah (Remix)" (2020)

Audio video
- "For the Night" on YouTube

"For the Night" is a song by American rapper Pop Smoke featuring fellow American rappers Lil Baby and DaBaby, from the former's posthumous debut studio album, Shoot for the Stars, Aim for the Moon (2020) as well as the EP of the same name (2020). It was written by the artists, producers CashMoneyAP and Palaze, and additional producer Mike Dean, with more additional production credits going to Wylo and Jess Jackson. The song was released as the fourth single from the album on October 3, 2020, by Victor Victor Worldwide and Republic Records, while an extended play (EP) was released for the song a few days later.

"For the Night" is a hip hop, trap, and soul song with lyrics about Pop Smoke's lack of commitment in relationships. The single debuted and peaked at number six on the US Billboard Hot 100, giving Pop Smoke his first, DaBaby his fourth, and Lil Baby his fifth top-10 hit in the US. The song reached the top-five on the Billboard airplay Hot R&B/Hip-Hop Songs and Rhythmic charts and was certified quadruple platinum by the Recording Industry Association of America (RIAA). It entered the top 10 on record charts in Portugal, New Zealand, Canada, and Greece. Critics named "For the Night" one of the best songs of 2020, noting the rapper's' performances and instrumentation.

== Background ==
Pop Smoke found the song's original beat on Danish record producer Palaze's YouTube channel. French producer CashMoneyAP reworked the song with Palaze, Daniel Mxras, Jess Jackson, and Mike Dean. CashMoneyAP added keys and bass while helping Palaze add drums. Pop Smoke's team was surprised when he recorded his vocals as it was the first time they heard him singing. Pop Smoke's team went to the Bahamas to work on his album when he played "For the Night" without warning to them. Record executive Steven Victor lauded the song and said they wanted to include vocals by American rapper Lil Baby. Victor thought having Lil Baby on "For the Night" would be creatively and sonically good as Pop Smoke had always wanted to work with him.

The track was supposed to feature Lil Baby and American rapper YoungBoy Never Broke Again, and YoungBoy wanted to be included in the track. CashMoneyAP decided not to feature him because he felt the rapper was not a good pick. After 50 Cent joined Victor on completing Pop Smoke's album, he called American rapper DaBaby to also be part of the song. DaBaby initially did not know that Lil Baby was part of the track. Jackson's main challenge was how to combine Lil Baby's timbre work with DaBaby. Jackson and Mike Dean mixed and recreated all of the music from scratch while keeping CashMoneyAP's drums.

== Writing and composition ==
"For the Night" was written by Pop Smoke, Lil Baby, DaBaby, CashMoneyAP, Palaze, and Wylo. It was produced by CashMoneyAP and Palaze while Wylo, Jess Jackson, and Mike Dean were credited as additional producers. "For the Night" is a hip hop, trap, and soul song consisting of an acoustic guitar, folk flutes, heavily autotuned vocals, and processed moans from Lil Baby and DaBaby. The three rappers dream about events that normally happen during the night. DaBaby pays tribute to Pop Smoke with the line, "Rest in peace to the Pop, make me smoke ya". Lil Baby also pays tribute by saying, "C.I.P Pop, I wish that you could see us."

== Critical reception ==
Critics called "For the Night" one of the best songs of 2020, such as the Los Angeles Times' August Brown who said it was a "convincingly dragged-out, haunting angle on his craft at the precipice of global stardom". They suggested it could be a "monster hit" and a "social media ready smash". Hannah Giorgis from The Atlantic opined that the song evokes the "recklessness of a summer party or the languid flirtation of stoop-side conversations". While Wongo Okon of Uproxx labeled the track as sinister, The Wall Street Journal's Mark Richardson considered it more welcoming than Pop Smoke's earlier songs.

Other critics highlighted the song's vocals and instrumentation, Ashton Howard of Earmilk declaring the rappers delivered a "phenomenally charismatic appearance". Journalists for Billboard and Variety complimented his flexibility, particularly his ability to step outside to try different genres beyond drill. Juan Gutierraz called it a "well-balanced rap tune" due to DaBaby's "baritone staccato flow" counterpointing the "higher auto-tuned voices" of Lil Baby and Pop Smoke. Giorgis stated Lil Baby and DaBaby add "arioso and vigor" to the song, and Slant Magazine's Charles Lyons-Burt praised DaBaby's vocals as "tough-talking" and having a "chest-puffing brio".

However, the vocals and instruments incorporated had lesser reviewers. Pitchfork's Alphonse Pierre cited the song as an example of the misuse of more popular rappers on Shoot for the Stars, Aim for the Moon; he argued they blurred the "animated personality and charisma" of the rapper, particularly calling "For the Night" a "forced Rap Caviar-bound marathon with Lil Baby and DaBaby". The Independent critic Roisin O'Connor also declared the song's autotuned vocals and folk flutes seemed outdated in comparison to Pop Smoke's gruff.

== Release and commercial performance ==
"For the Night" was released on Pop Smoke's posthumous debut studio album Shoot for the Stars, Aim for the Moon, as the third track on July 3, 2020. The song was later released as the album's fourth single on October 3, 2020, by Victor Victor Worldwide and Republic Records. An EP for "For the Night" of the same name was released on October 7, 2020. The EP also features "Hello", "The Woo", "Got It on Me", "Creature", and "Aim for the Moon.

Following the release of Shoot for the Stars, Aim for the Moon, "For the Night" debuted and peaked at number six on the US Billboard Hot 100, giving Pop Smoke his first, DaBaby his fourth, and Lil Baby his fifth top-10 hit in the US. The song simultaneously peaked at number four on the US Hot R&B/Hip-Hop Songs and number one on the US Rhythmic charts, with the latter becoming Pop Smoke's first song to top the chart and any Billboard chart altogether. "For the Night" remained atop the Rhythmic chart five nonconsecutive weeks, making it Pop Smoke's longest reign at number one. The Recording Industry Association of America certified the single a octuple platinum certification, which denotes eight million units based on sales and track-equivalent on-demand streams.

The single also reached the top 10 in Canada, New Zealand, Norway, Switzerland, and Portugal. It peaked at number one in Greece's singles chart. The song was certified double platinum in Australia by the Australian Recording Industry Association while being certified gold in Austria and the United Kingdom by the International Federation of the Phonographic Industry and British Phonographic Industry, respectively.

== Track listings ==
- For The Night - EP
1. "For the Night" (featuring Lil Baby and DaBaby) - 3:12
2. "Hello" (featuring A Boogie wit da Hoodie) - 3:11
3. "The Woo" (featuring 50 Cent and Roddy Ricch) - 3:22
4. "Got It on Me" - 2:45
5. "Creature" (featuring Swae Lee) - 3:23
6. "Aim for the Moon" (featuring Quavo) - 2:56

== Credits and personnel ==
Credits adapted from Tidal.

- Pop Smoke – vocals, songwriter
- Lil Baby – vocals, songwriter
- DaBaby – vocals, songwriter
- CashMoneyAP – production, programming, songwriter
- Palaze – production, programming, songwriter
- Wylo – additional producer, songwriter
- Jess Jackson – additional producer, mixing engineer
- Mike Dean – additional producer
- Corey Nutile – recording engineer
- Rose Adams – assistant mixer
- Sage Skofield – assistant mixer
- Sean Solymar – assistant mixer
- Princston Terry – engineer
- Stephen Farrow – engineer
- Daniel Moras Raab – programming
- Thomas Mann – vocal mixing

== Charts ==
=== Weekly charts ===
Weekly chart performance for "For the Night"
Chart (2020–2021)	Peak position
Australia (ARIA)	13
Austria (Ö3 Austria Top 40)	19
Belgium (Ultratop 50 Flanders)	41
Belgium (Ultratip Bubbling Under Wallonia)	3
Canada Hot 100 (Billboard)	7
Czech Republic Singles Digital (ČNS IFPI)	41
Denmark (Tracklisten)	16
France (SNEP)	31
Germany (GfK)	28
Greece International (IFPI)	1
Global 200 (Billboard)	7
Hungary (Stream Top 40)	18
Iceland (Tónlistinn)	15
Ireland (IRMA)	14
Italy (FIMI)	69
Netherlands (Single Top 100)	15
New Zealand (RMNZ)	9
Norway (VG-lista)	8
Portugal (AFP)	5
Romania (Airplay 100)	77
Slovakia Singles Digital (ČNS IFPI)	39
Sweden (Sverigetopplistan)	18
Switzerland (Schweizer Hitparade)	7
UK Singles (Official Charts)	14
US Billboard Hot 100	6
US Hot R&B/Hip-Hop Songs (Billboard)	4
US Rhythmic Airplay (Billboard)	1
US Rolling Stone Top 100	2

=== Year-end charts ===
2020 year-end chart positions for "For the Night"
Chart (2020)	Position
Australia (ARIA)	83
Austria (Ö3 Austria Top 40)	70
Canada (Canadian Hot 100)	51
Denmark (Tracklisten)	73
France (SNEP)	114
Hungary (Stream Top 40)	62
Netherlands (Single Top 100)	61
Sweden (Sverigetopplistan)	82
Switzerland (Schweizer Hitparade)	37
UK Singles (OCC)	99
US Billboard Hot 100	49
US Hot R&B/Hip-Hop Songs (Billboard)	24

2021 year-end chart positions for "For the Night"
Chart (2021)	Position
Global 200 (Billboard)	40
Portugal (AFP)	67
US Billboard Hot 100	32
US Hot R&B/Hip-Hop Songs (Billboard)	18
US Rhythmic (Billboard)	3

== Certifications ==
Certifications and sales for "For the Night"
Region	Certification	Certified units/sales
Australia (ARIA)	2× Platinum	140,000^{‡}
Austria (IFPI Austria)	Gold	15,000^{‡}
Brazil (Pro-Música Brasil)	Diamond	160,000^{‡}
Denmark (IFPI Danmark)	Platinum	90,000^{‡}
France (SNEP)	Diamond	333,333^{‡}
Germany (BVMI)	Gold	200,000^{‡}
Italy (FIMI)	Platinum	70,000^{‡}
New Zealand (RMNZ)	3× Platinum	90,000^{‡}
Poland (ZPAV)	Platinum	50,000^{‡}
Portugal (AFP)	2× Platinum	20,000^{‡}
Spain (Promusicae)	Gold	30,000^{‡}
United Kingdom (BPI)	Platinum	600,000^{‡}
United States (RIAA)	8× Platinum	8,000,000^{‡}
Streaming
Greece (IFPI Greece)	Platinum	2,000,000^{†}
Sweden (GLF)	Platinum	8,000,000^{†}
^{‡} Sales+streaming figures based on certification alone.^{†} Streaming-only figures based on certification alone.
