= Mood Swings (Pop Smoke song) =

2020 single by Pop Smoke featuring Lil Tjay

- Summer Walker remix cover

Single by Pop Smoke featuring Lil Tjay

from the album Shoot for the Stars, Aim for the Moon
- Released: August 21, 2020
- Recorded: 2019 – 2020
- Genre: R&B
- Length: 3:33
- Label: Victor Victor; Republic
- Songwriters: Bashar Jackson; Tione Merritt; Omar Gomez; DeAndre Sumpter
- Producers: Beat Menace; Dizzy Banko

Pop Smoke singles chronology
"The Woo" (2020)	"Mood Swings" (2020)	"For the Night" (2020)

Lil Tjay singles chronology
"Ice Cold" (2020)	"Mood Swings" (2020)	"Losses" (2020)

Music video
- "Mood Swings" on YouTube

"Mood Swings" is a song by American rapper Pop Smoke featuring fellow American rapper Lil Tjay, from the former's posthumous debut studio album, Shoot for the Stars, Aim for the Moon (2020). The song was written by the artists alongside producers Beat Menace and Dizzy Banko with additional production from Kiwi. The song was released as the third single from the album on August 21, 2020, by Victor Victor Worldwide and Republic Records. A remix that features Summer Walker was released as a single and an extended play (EP) was released for the song.

"Mood Swings" is a R&B song with lyrics about having sex with women off their birth control. The single received mixed reviews—some reviewers criticized Lil Tjay's lyrics, while others considered the song to be tender and corny. It peaked at number 17 on the US Billboard Hot 100 and number 5 on the UK Singles Chart, giving Lil Tjay his first and Pop Smoke his second top 10 hit in the United Kingdom. Internationally, the song has peaked within the top five of three other countries, including Portugal, where it peaked at number one. The song received a double platinum certification from the Recording Industry Association of America (RIAA), which denotes track-equivalent sales of over two million units.

A visualizer was made for "Mood Swings" and released on August 20, 2020. It features Jordyn Woods, and Dylan and Dakota Gonzalez doing several activities, such as posing by a swimming pool and in sports cars. A music video was made for the song and released on October 7, 2020. It was directed by David Wept, and features Lil Tjay and Lala Baptiste in an on and off relationship, while also showing pictures of Pop Smoke in an eternal blue flame.

== Background and composition ==
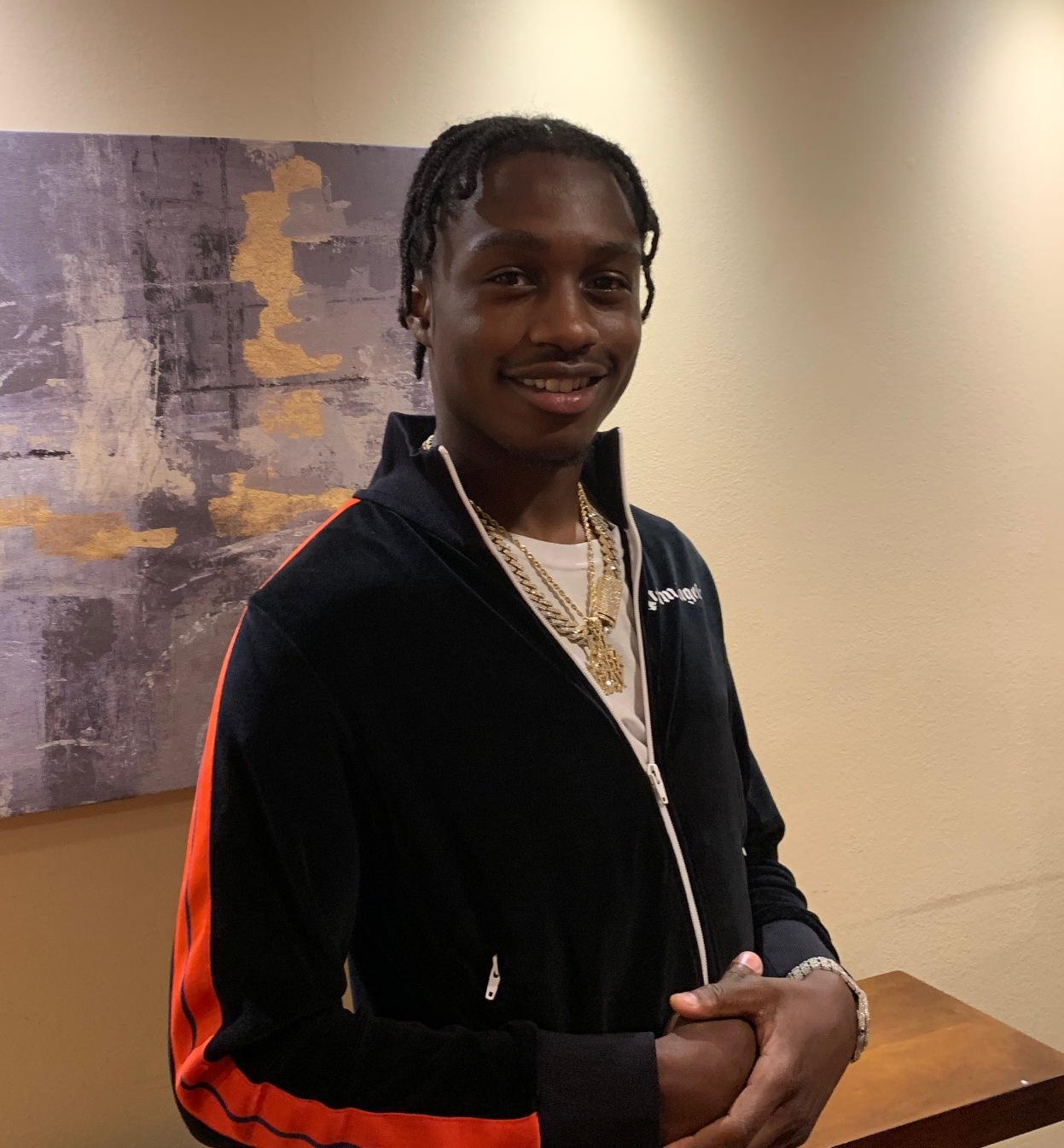
"Mood Swings" features vocals from Lil Tjay.

Prior to "Mood Swings", Pop Smoke and Lil Tjay had previously collaborated on the tracks "War", "Mannequin", "Mary Jane", and "Zoo York". Lil Tjay also released "Forever Pop" in February 2020, a tribute track to Pop Smoke. Beat Menace recalled an engineer had already created a beat for the song, but Pop Smoke's record label did not like it. They contacted Beat Menace to make his own version. Because Pop Smoke's cadence was over the old beat, the producers had to work with the same flow, but changed the entire instrumental. Producer Dizzy Banko, who incorporated drums and snares into the song upon the request of Beat Menace, was personally contacted by Pop Smoke mere weeks before his murder. Pop Smoke's team approved of the new beat and the producers worked together with the label's engineer to further work on it; Lil Tjay was then added to the track.

The song was written by Pop Smoke and Lil Tjay, who are credited under their legal names of Bashar Jackson and Tione Merritt, Omar Gomez, and Deandre Sumpter. Sumpter and Gomez handled the programming for "Mood Swings". The song was produced by Beat Menace and Dizzy Banko, while co-produced by Kiwi. Mixing was handled by Jess Jackson, while Rose Adams, Sage Skofield, and Sean Solymar were credited as assistant mixers. Jess Jackson, Skofeild, and Corey Nutlie received credit as the engineers. "Mood Swings" was released on Pop Smoke's posthumous debut studio album Shoot for the Stars, Aim for the Moon, as the thirteenth track on July 3, 2020. The song was later released as the album's third single on August 21, 2020. A remix featuring American singer Summer Walker was released as a single on September 18, 2020. The remix was later included on an EP for "Mood Swings" of the same name, which was released on September 22, 2020. The EP also featured "What You Know Bout Love", "Imperfections (Interlude)", "Something Special", and a remix of "Diana".

Music journalists described "Mood Swings" as a "sultry", and "raunchy" R&B track. The song contains percussive production, which The Atlantic's Hannah Giorgis said, "complements the artists' amorous lyrics." Paste writer Jade Gomez wrote that Pop Smoke effortlessly raps about having sex with women off their birth control, while issuing them a reminder that he is not interested in a relationship. Abby Monteil of The Buffalo News cited that the song, "details the 'mood swings' that [Pop Smoke's] girlfriend goes to after realizing that he's not using a condom during sex."

== Critical reception ==
Comparing it to Kanye West's sound on 808s & Heartbreak (2008), Variety's A.D. Amorosi said the song and "Something Special" are so romantic, they ended up as corny, but in a "genuinely touching fashion". Amorosi concluded that the song had "delicious melodies to guide Pop Smoke". Roisin O'Connor of The Independent called the track "surprisingly tender" in comparison to other tracks on the album "that detail sexual encounters with a cold detachment". NME's Dhruva Balram identified the song shows that Pop Smoke had intentions to try different types of genres. Similarly, Danny Schwartz of Rolling Stone praised Pop Smoke's versatility, stating, it was "endearing" to hear him rap about lowering his guard, ease his rasp, and trade his endless swagger for tenderness. The Atlantic's Hannah Giorgis said the song is one of the "surprising suite of tracks late in the album," and calls it "the most original" of its kind. Courtney Wynter of GRM Daily described the song as a "laid-back offering".

Briana Younger of NPR noted that Pop Smoke sounds "scarily like 50 Cent". In a negative review, HipHopDX's David Aaron Brake criticized Lil Tjay's verse for being "half-assed" and poorly mixed, attributing this to his verse being a late addition to Shoot for the Stars, Aim for the Moon. Charles Lyons-Burt of Slant Magazine opined that when Pop Smoke ad-libs: 'Oh, you ain't know I could sing?,' at the beginning of the song, it comes "across as empty boast". Alphonse Pierre of Pitchfork described it as a "sweet-sounding love song with an edge" but said it had "unsettling lyrics".

The remix of "Mood Swings" received generally positive reviews from music critics. Wongo Okon of Uproxx stated that Walker stepped into the spotlight, and added a mood of her own on the remix. Writing for Complex, Jordan Rose commented that Walker offered her talents on the remix, saying she fits in perfectly as she "croons over the smooth beat with Pop Smoke's adlibs in the background". Jordan Darville, writing for The Fader described Summer's performance on the remix as "eisty, and said "the chemistry between [Pop] Smoke and Walker is there in spades". Heran Mamo of Billboard magazine added that Walker added her "signature R&B flair" to the remix.

== Commercial performance ==
Following the release of Shoot for the Stars, Aim for the Moon, "Mood Swings" debuted at number 44 on the US Billboard Hot 100, later reaching number 17 on the chart. "Mood Swings" has also peaked at number 13 on the US Billboard Global 200. It further peaked at number eight on the US Hot R&B/Hip-Hop Songs chart. It was certified double platinum by the Recording Industry Association of America (RIAA), denoting track-equivalent sales and streams of 2,000,000 units in the United States. On the UK Singles Chart, the song entered at number 23 for the issue dated July 10, 2020. The song later rose to number five on the chart, giving Lil Tjay his first and Pop Smoke his second top 10 single in the United Kingdom. The song was certified double Platinum by the British Phonographic Industry (BPI), denoting track-equivalent sales and streams of 1,200,000 units in the UK. It has peaked within the top 10 in Denmark and Ireland, and further reached the top five in Australia and New Zealand. "Mood Swings" was most successful in Portugal, peaking at number one on the country's singles chart. In late July 2020, the song started trending on video-sharing app TikTok.

== Music videos ==
A visualizer for "Mood Swings" was released on August 20, 2020. The visual features Jordyn Woods, and Dylan and Dakota Gonzalez. They lip sync the song's lyrics as they travel across several venues and locations, look in a mirror as they fix their hair, and pose by a swimming pool and in sports cars. A music video for "Mood Swings" was later released on October 7, 2020, and was directed by David Wept. The visual features Lil Tjay and his girlfriend Lala Baptiste. It starts with Baptiste complaining about Lil Tjay to her friend, but later gets a text from him and asks her friend to drive her back to his mansion. The couple are seen being sweet and loving to each other, but things get negative and they start arguing. Even after they breakup, Baptiste still goes back to her lover. The video also shows an eternal blue flame containing a variety of pictures of Pop Smoke that flickers on and off when his verses come in.

== Track listing ==
- Digital download / streaming – Remix
1. Mood Swings (feat. Lil Tjay and Summer Walker) – 4:14
- Digital download / streaming – EP
1. "Mood Swings" (Remix; featuring Lil Tjay and Summer Walker) – 4:14
2. "What You Know Bout Love" – 2:40
3. "Imperfections" (Interlude) – 1:48
4. "Something Special" – 2:38
5. "Diana" (Remix; featuring King Combs and Calboy) – 3:54

== Credits and personnel ==
Credits adapted from Tidal.

- Bashar Jackson – vocals, writer
- Tione Merritt – vocals, writer
- Beat Menace – producer
- Dizzy Banko – producer
- Kiwi – co-producer
- Omar Gomez – programming, writer, associated performer
- Deandre Sumpter – programming, writer, associated performer
- Jess Jackson – engineer, mix engineer
- Corey Nutlie – engineer
- Sage Skofeild – engineer, assistant mix engineer
- Sean Solymar – assistant mix engineer
- Rose Adams – assistant mix engineer

== Charts ==
=== Weekly charts ===
Weekly chart performance for "Mood Swings"
Chart (2020)	Peak position
Australia (ARIA)	5
Austria (Ö3 Austria Top 40)	29
Belgium (Ultratop 50 Flanders)	48
Canada Hot 100 (Billboard)	14
Denmark (Tracklisten)	7
France (SNEP)	105
Germany (GfK)	30
Global 200 (Billboard)	13
Iceland (Tónlistinn)	12
Ireland (IRMA)	9
Italy (FIMI)	97
Netherlands (Single Top 100)	22
New Zealand (Recorded Music NZ)	4
Norway (VG-lista)	14
Portugal (AFP)	1
Scottish Singles Sales (Official Charts)	62
Sweden (Sverigetopplistan)	11
Switzerland (Schweizer Hitparade)	11
UK Singles (Official Charts)	5
US Billboard Hot 100	17
US Hot R&B/Hip-Hop Songs (Billboard)	8
US Rolling Stone Top 100	6

=== Year-end charts ===
2020 year-end chart positions for "Mood Swings"
Chart (2020)	Position
Canada (Canadian Hot 100)	67
Denmark (Tracklisten)	80
Portugal (AFP)	96
Switzerland (Schweizer Hitparade)	72
UK Singles (OCC)	54
US Billboard Hot 100	81
US Hot R&B/Hip-Hop Songs (Billboard)	40

2021 year-end chart positions for "Mood Swings"
Chart (2021)	Position
Global 200 (Billboard)	187

== Certifications ==
Certifications and sales for "Mood Swings"
Region	Certification	Certified units/sales
Australia (ARIA)	2× Platinum	140,000^{‡}
Austria (IFPI Austria)	Gold	15,000^{‡}
Brazil (Pro-Música Brasil)	Platinum	40,000^{‡}
Canada (Music Canada)	Gold	40,000^{‡}
Denmark (IFPI Danmark)	Platinum	90,000^{‡}
France (SNEP)	Platinum	200,000^{‡}
Germany (BVMI)	Gold	200,000^{‡}
Italy (FIMI)	Gold	35,000^{‡}
New Zealand (RMNZ)	3× Platinum	90,000^{‡}
Poland (ZPAV)	Gold	25,000^{‡}
Portugal (AFP)	2× Platinum	20,000^{‡}
Spain (Promusicae)	Gold	30,000^{‡}
United Kingdom (BPI)	2× Platinum	1,200,000^{‡}
United States (RIAA)	3× Platinum	3,000,000^{‡}
Streaming
Greece (IFPI Greece)	Gold	1,000,000^{†}
Sweden (GLF)	Platinum	8,000,000^{†}
^{‡} Sales+streaming figures based on certification alone.^{†} Streaming-only figures based on certification alone.

== See also ==
- List of number-one singles of 2020 (Portugal)
