= Enjoy Yourself =

Enjoy Yourself may refer to:

- Enjoy Yourself (Billy Currington album) (2010)
- Enjoy Yourself (Kylie Minogue album) (1989)
- "Enjoy Yourself" (A+ song) (1998)
- "Enjoy Yourself" (The Jacksons song) (1976)
- "Enjoy Yourself (It's Later than You Think)", a 1949 song by Carl Sigman and Herb Magidson
- "Enjoy Yourself" (Pop Smoke song) (2020)
- "Enjoy Yourself", a song from The Glorification of Sadness
