= Shoot for the Stars, Aim for the Moon =

Studio album by Pop Smoke
- Released: July 3, 2020
- Recorded: 2019; 2020
- Studios: Chalice (Los Angeles); Crosby (Los Angeles); EastWest (Los Angeles); Encore (Los Angeles); Paramount (Los Angeles); Track Record (Los Angeles); United (Los Angeles); Flossy (Brooklyn); Studio 92 (Brooklyn); Mudd Monkey (New York City); Penthouse (New York City); Quad (New York City); Sanctuary (Nassau); Tape London (London); Twin (Paris)
- Genres: Drill; trap; R&B
- Length: 56:41
- Labels: Victor Victor; Republic
- Producers: 5ive Beatz; 808Melo; Band on the Beat; Beat Menace; BloodPop; BongoByTheWay; Buddah Bless; Carson Hackney; CashMoneyAP; Dizzy Banko; The Elements; Hakz Beats; IAmTash; Jess Jackson; Jugraj Nagra; Kdi; Luci G; MobzBeatz; Mora Beats; Mustard; Palaze; Relly Made; Rico Beats; SephGotTheWaves; Seth Da Chef; SpunkBigga; Swirv; Szamz; WondaGurl; Yamaica; Young Devante; YoungKio

Pop Smoke chronology
Meet the Woo 2 (2020)	Shoot for the Stars, Aim for the Moon (2020)	Faith (2021)

Singles from Shoot for the Stars, Aim for the Moon
- 1. "Make It Rain" Released: June 12, 2020; 2. "The Woo" Released: July 10, 2020; 3. "Mood Swings" Released: August 21, 2020; 4. "For the Night" Released: October 3, 2020; 5. "What You Know Bout Love" Released: October 9, 2020; 6. "Hello" Released: February 9, 2021

Shoot for the Stars, Aim for the Moon is the debut studio album by American rapper Pop Smoke. It was posthumously released on July 3, 2020, by Victor Victor Worldwide and Republic Records, and a deluxe edition of the album that includes fifteen additional tracks—including remixes of three songs from the original—was released on July 20 that year, a date that would have been Pop Smoke's 21st birthday. It is a drill, trap, and R&B record.

American rapper 50 Cent executive-produced Shoot for the Stars, Aim for the Moon following the murder of Pop Smoke during a home invasion on February 19, 2020. 50 Cent finished the album for Pop Smoke by calling the featured artists and taking care of the deadlines. After the completion, 50 Cent helped fulfill Pop Smoke's wish to take his mother to an awards show. Jess Jackson mastered and sequenced Shoot for the Stars, Aim for the Moon and reworked the tracks to get the professional sound of a big recording studio. Before his death, Pop Smoke had begun to set up the Shoot for the Stars Foundation to help youth achieve their goals while living and growing up in difficult circumstances, providing access to technology and other resources. Guest appearances on the album include Quavo, Lil Baby, DaBaby, Swae Lee, Future, Rowdy Rebel, 50 Cent, Roddy Ricch, Tyga, Karol G, Lil Tjay, and King Combs. The deluxe edition of the album adds appearances from Fivio Foreign, Dafi Woo, Dread Woo, Davido, PnB Rock, Jamie Foxx, Gunna, Young Thug, A Boogie wit da Hoodie, Queen Naija, Calboy, and Burna Boy.

Shoot for the Stars, Aim for the Moon was supported by six singles, including US Billboard Hot 100 top-20 hits "The Woo", "Mood Swings", "For the Night", and "What You Know Bout Love". Shoot for the Stars, Aim for the Moon was a commercial success, debuting at number one on the US Billboard 200 and giving Pop Smoke his first US number-one album. All 19 tracks on the standard album also charted on the Billboard Hot 100 following its first week of release, which gave the late rapper the most simultaneous entries on the Hot 100 posthumously. The album spent two non-consecutive weeks atop the Billboard 200 and received a double platinum certification. With Shoot for the Stars, Aim for the Moon spending 34 weeks in the top five of the Billboard 200, it became the fourth album in the 21st century to spend so many weeks in the top five.

The album also topped the US Top R&B/Hip-Hop Albums for 19 non-consecutive weeks and Top Rap Albums chart for 20 non-consecutive weeks, making it the longest-running number-one record on the latter chart. Shoot for the Stars, Aim for the Moon received mostly positive reviews from music critics upon release and multiple publications praised the production. It appeared on several publications' lists of the best albums of 2020, including being placed in the top-10 by Billboard, Complex, The New York Times, The Ringer, and NPR. The album won Top Billboard 200 Album and Top Rap Album at the 2021 Billboard Music Awards.

== Background ==
American record producer Rico Beats introduced rapper Pop Smoke to record executive Steven Victor in April 2019. After signing to Victor's label Victor Victor Worldwide and Republic Records, Pop Smoke told Victor in addition to rapping, he had experience as a singer, having previously sung for services at a church. To demonstrate his abilities, Pop Smoke played Victor an unreleased song called "Something Special" and a track called "What You Know Bout Love"; the latter made a deep impact on Victor Victor executives, persuading them Pop Smoke was more than "just another drill rapper from Brooklyn". Victor knew that many of rap's most popular musicians had been responsible for pushing new sounds into the mainstream because he worked closely with American rapper Kanye West as the chief operating officer of his record label GOOD Music at the time. The record executive devised a strategy in which Pop Smoke would go on to create a series of mixtapes devoted only to Brooklyn drill, which would be "raw, gritty street rap with bass-heavy production". After Pop Smoke would establish himself as the "leader" of the subgenre that was growing in New York City, he would then release a debut album that showcased his melodic side with bigger, more mainstream songs like "Something Special".

On February 19, 2020, less than a year after signing his record deal, Pop Smoke was renting an Airbnb owned by The Real Housewives star Teddi Mellencamp and her husband, Edwin Arroyave, in Hollywood Hills, California. The rapper was killed at the age of 20 during an attempted home invasion. Four hooded men, one of whom was wearing a ski mask and carrying a handgun, broke into the house Pop Smoke was renting. A 15-year-old boy, the youngest of the four intruders, shot Pop Smoke three times in the chest with a Beretta M9 after fighting with him. The robbers stole Pop Smoke's diamond-studded Rolex watch, which they sold for $2,000. Pop Smoke was rushed to Cedars-Sinai Medical Center, where doctors performed a thoracotomy on the left side of his chest but a few hours later, he was pronounced dead. The day before his murder, Pop Smoke and friend Mike Dee had posted several images on their social media, including one in which Mellencamp's home address can be seen in the background. The rapper also posted a story on Instagram and Facebook of gifts he had received. One showed the house's full address on the packaging, giving out its location.

At the beginning of March 2020, American rapper 50 Cent announced on his Instagram feed he had been listening to Pop Smoke's work and had decided to help finish the late artist's debut album by serving as executive producer. As executive producer, 50 Cent contacted artists Roddy Ricch, Drake, and Chris Brown, asking them if they wanted to be included on the record. A few weeks later, 50 Cent recalled during an Instagram live when he first met Pop Smoke in an office. The late rapper was focused on his phone, making 50 Cent annoyed. He got up and saw that Pop Smoke was actually writing everything he said down on his phone. He stated he "fell in love" with Pop Smoke and was going to executive produce his album. In a later interview with Billboard, 50 Cent said he would not earn any money as the album's executive producer—he wanted to finish it because of his relationship with Pop Smoke. After production was completed, 50 Cent helped fulfill Pop Smoke's desire to take his mother to an awards show. Pop Smoke had begun to set up the Shoot for the Stars Foundation in January 2020 to help young people achieve their goals despite living and growing up in difficult circumstances, providing access to technology and other resources. After his death, Pop Smoke's family announced they would continue the foundation.

== Recording ==
Before being signed to VVW, Pop Smoke had recorded the first songs for Shoot for the Stars, Aim for the Moon in Los Angeles, London, the Bahamas, and Paris. After completing his mixtapes Meet the Woo (2019) and Meet the Woo 2 (2020), Pop Smoke wanted to show how he had matured musically. In mid-February 2020, he flew to Los Angeles to record as much music as possible for the album. In the last days of his life, he recorded the album's final songs. Pop Smoke and his team were planning to complete the album in Los Angeles; he was also scheduled to embark on his debut headlining concert tour "Meet the Woo Tour" from the first week of March; his album was to have been mixed and mastered while he was on tour.

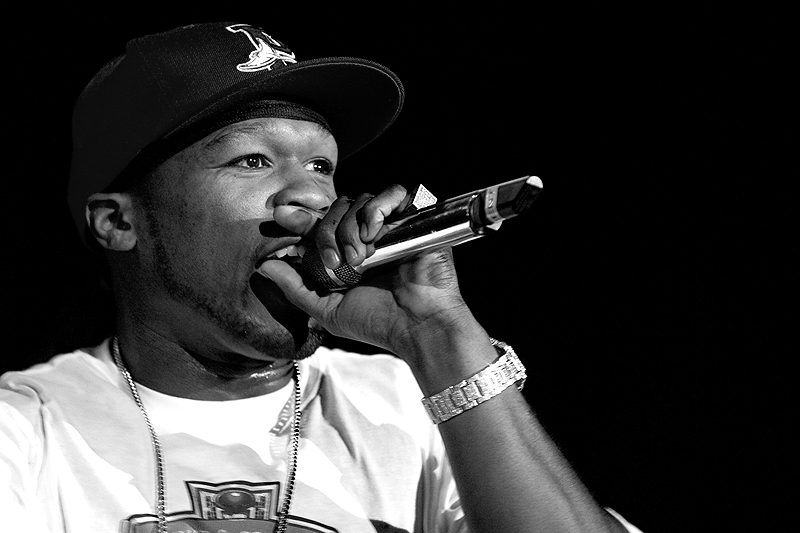
American rapper 50 Cent (pictured in 2007) served as executive producer of the album.

According to Victor, Pop Smoke's debut album was meant to showcase his talent. Pop Smoke told 50 Cent he was working on the album and would send him songs. The former told the late rapper he wanted him to re-record his songs. After Pop Smoke was murdered, Victor lost interest in finishing the album until he met with 50 Cent, who persuaded Victor finishing the album would help honor Pop Smoke's wish for it to be released by the summer of 2020. 50 Cent also argued the record's release would help support Pop Smoke's family. To ensure the album's release, 50 Cent told Victor if he was not ready to complete the project, he would executive-produce the album. Victor agreed to this, and 50 Cent listened to all of the songs, sequenced them, and promoted the album. 50 Cent, in an interview with Complex said Pop Smoke had recorded "about 50 or 60 tracks. Some of them were not completed ... Some had a chorus that was finished, and then somebody else rapped to it, and he put a verse on it". According to Victor, "eighty percent of the songs were finished" before 50 Cent got involved and largely "added some ad-libs or changed a verse here and there".

Jess Jackson, the album's mastering engineer, described his job as "wizardry", largely because he was constrained by the sometimes poorly recorded material and unfinished double vocals. According to Jackson in Complex, "if [Pop Smoke] was around to this day, I would ask him to get back in the studio and just lay in an additional double or something". Jackson refined the tracks to get the professional sound of a big recording studio; he wanted to honor Pop Smoke's memory by not "chang[ing] it to a large extent". While sequencing the album, Republic Records wanted the track-listing to be a certain way but Jackson realized some tracks did not work together. Jackson and the record company cooperated to sequence the album so each song is in time with the next track. Jackson submitted the final version of the album's masters at 06:00 on June 30, 2020; he said it had been a difficult process and that he had been working on the album for over six months, often working on it for 10 to 12 hours a day.

"Paranoia" originally contained a verse from Pusha T. UMG forced the verse to be removed from the track as they believed it contained lyrics dissing Drake.

== Music and lyrics ==
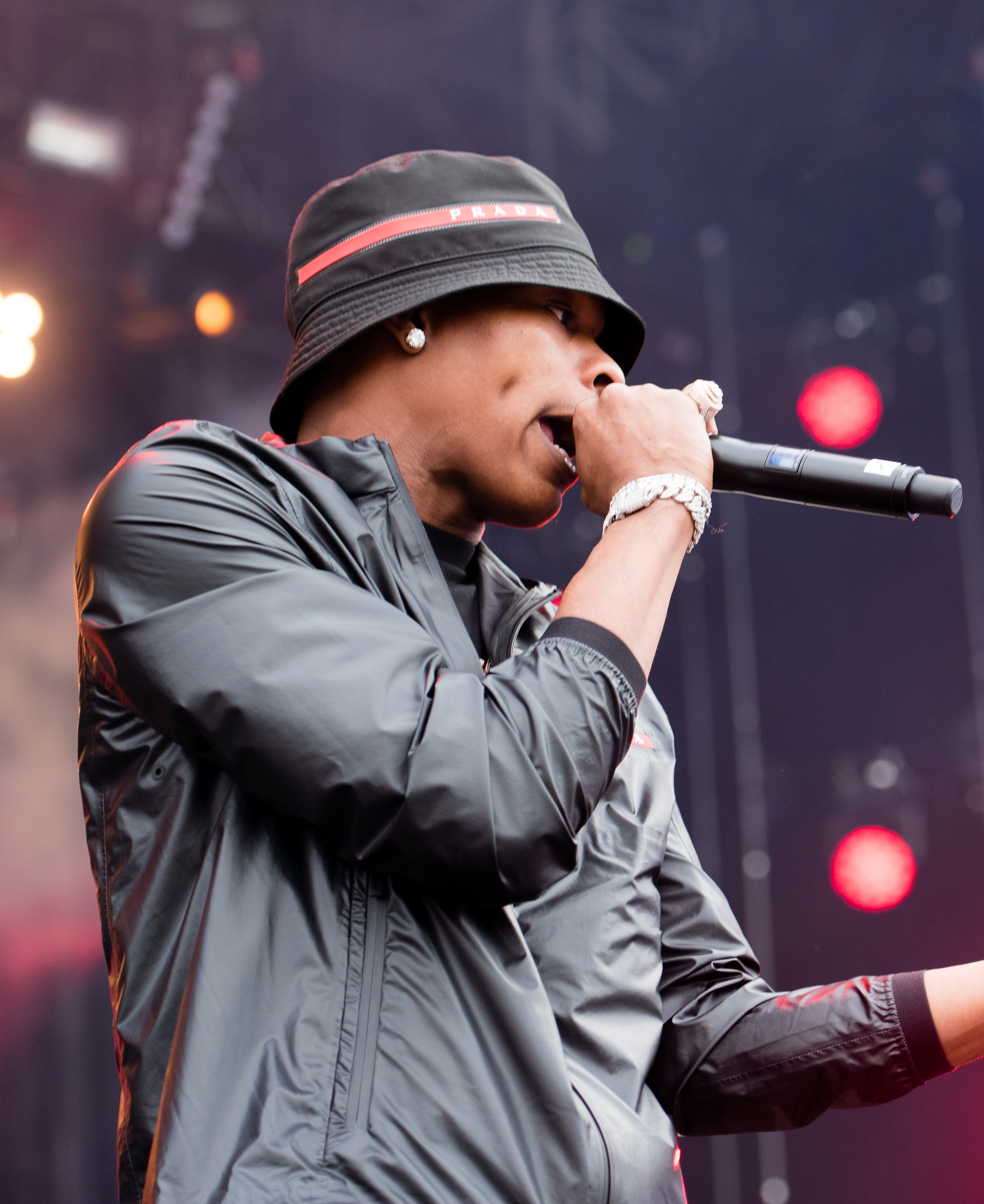
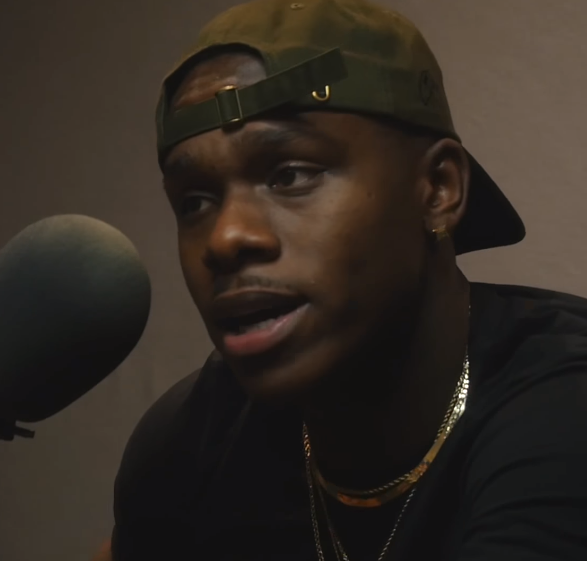
Lil Baby (left) and DaBaby (right) are featured on the album's fourth single "For the Night".

According to Danny Schwartz of Rolling Stone, Shoot for the Stars, Aim for the Moon merges "drill's swooping rhythms" with "austere Atlanta trap that Migos and Zaytoven mastered mid-decade". Slant Magazine's Charles Lyons-Burt noted it has "ill-advised forays into R&B found on DaBaby's Blame It on Baby". The staff of Billboard said the album "gestures toward R&B and more soulful sounds". Shoot for the Stars, Aim for the Moon opens with "Bad Bitch from Tokyo", which consists of drumbeats, ad-libbed harmonies, crows cawing, and Pop Smoke rapping about his own death. "Aim for the Moon" featuring Quavo is a drill track that uses braggadocio, hi-hats, and bass. Pop Smoke and Quavo rap about enjoying their successes.

"For the Night" featuring Lil Baby and DaBaby is a hip-hop, trap, and soul song that incorporates an acoustic guitar, folk flutes, heavily autotuned vocals, and processed moans from Lil Baby and DaBaby. Its lyrics detail night-time occurrences. The fourth track, "44 Bulldog", is a drill track that was named after the Charter Arms Bulldog, a traditional double-action revolver. It consists of enigmatic barks and sung synth tones. On the R&B song "Gangstas", which features minimalist piano and snare drums, Pop Smoke claims to be the king of New York and expresses his dislike for 6ix9ine. Craig Jenkins of Vulture stated the drill tracks "Yea Yea" and "Creature" featuring Swae Lee are about a "tough-guy rapper pivot[ing] flawlessly into romance on the horizon". "Snitching" featuring Quavo and Future is a trap song on which Pop Smoke raps about the threats he faced every day while Quavo and Future rap to bring awareness to the traitors of the world. "The Woo", which features 50 Cent and Roddy Ricch, is a trap song that interpolates 50 Cent's 2005 single "Candy Shop".

"Make it Rain" which features Rowdy Rebel, an American rapper who at the time was incarcerated, had to record his verse by telephone. On the eleventh track "West Coast Shit" featuring Quavo and Tyga, Pop Smoke and Tyga rap about the wonders of the west coast of the US. "Enjoy Yourself", a Latin trap and urbano song that features Colombian singer Karol G, contains a sample of "Drink Freely" by Moroccan-American rapper French Montana. The lyrics are a sentimental reflection on love. The following track, "Something Special", is an R&B-bounce song that samples Fabolous's 2003 single "Into You". It finds Pop Smoke obsessing over his new partner and their newly found love. "Mood Swings" featuring Lil Tjay is an R&B song whose lyrics are about having sex with women who are not using birth control. An R&B track, "What You Know Bout Love", in which Pop Smoke sings about his passion for his lover, samples Ginuwine's song "Differences". This track is followed by R&B track "Diana", which features King Combs and contains excerpts from Playa's 1998 single "Cheers 2 U". In its lyrics, Pop Smoke is lustful and throws a confident shot at love. Hip-hop track "Got It on Me" interpolates the lyrics of 50 Cent's "Many Men (Wish Death)". In the lyrics, Pop Smoke pleads for mercy from his enemies. "Tunnel Vision (Outro)" is a drill track in which Pop Smoke is looking towards his future and wanting to have an impact on the music industry. The album closes with the bonus track "Dior", a drill and hip-hop song with lyrics about flirting with women and buying the latest designer clothes.

== Title and artwork ==
American designer Virgil Abloh's original album cover received significant criticism for its design and prompted fans to want it to be changed.

Xiarra-Diamond Nimrod, the manager of marketing strategy for Republic Records, said Shoot for the Stars, Aim for the Moon is a phrase Pop Smoke often used during interviews, urging his fans to abide by it. He used it for the name of his foundation and mentioned it in his songs, including "Invincible" and "Aim for the Moon". Nimrod thought it was important his message was heard and felt on his album.

The album's original artwork, which American designer Virgil Abloh created, provoked significant criticism from fans, who called it "lazy" and "rushed", and said it was disrespectful. An online petition attracted tens of thousands of signatures. Abloh used a picture of Pop Smoke that was the first result of a Google Images search. A few hours later, the label announced it would replace Abloh's artwork in time for the album's release date.

I think it's important that we as young Black kids and community support and reference each other rather than looking for it outside of our ecosystem. To me, [the original album cover I made] was exactly that. There was a bond and synergy amongst both of us just being ourselves. It was completely organic.

— Abloh in an interview with Complex

50 Cent also criticized Abloh's artwork and posted over 35 fan-made designs, saying "they ain't going for this bullshit". After Abloh said he based his cover design on a conversation he had with Pop Smoke, American conceptual artist Ryder Ripps accused Abloh of stealing Ripps' "chrome rose" concept and "[ruining] it with a careless design", adding it was "so sad that someone would care this little about art, design and the memory of a human who was so loved to wrap his name up in lies and theft". Ripps created the album's final cover art, depicting a chrome rose against a black background. Hours before the album's commercial release, Pop Smoke's mother chose the final album cover. According to Ripps:

I was brought on to do design and creative direction for this project, and I was experimenting with flowers in 3D at the time. While I was experimenting, I realized, "Oh my God, this is so perfect". People use flowers to memorialize people, and by fixing it in metal, it's taking something that's fleeting and making it permanent.

— Ripps in an interview with Complex

== Release and promotion ==
Pop Smoke had wanted the album to be released in the northern hemisphere summer, close to his birthday on July 20. Before his murder, the album was to have been released on June 12, Memorial Day, an American federal holiday, Pop Smoke's team announced on May 14, 2020, that the album had a planned release date of June 12, 2020, but the lead single "Make It Rain" was released on that date instead, and Victor announced they had postponed the album's release to July 3, 2020, out of respect for the George Floyd protests against police brutality and systemic racism. Pop Smoke's estate announced they had signed a co-publishing deal with Warner Chappell Music covering his past music and Shoot for the Stars, Aim for the Moon.

Victor Victor Worldwide and Republic Records released Shoot for the Stars, Aim for the Moon worldwide on July 3, 2020. The deluxe edition of the album was released on July 20, 2020, on what would have been Pop Smoke's 21st birthday and features fifteen additional tracks, including remixes of three songs from the original album. The first single from the album, "Make it Rain", peaked at number 49 on the US Billboard Hot 100 and at number 73 on the UK Singles Chart. "Enjoy Yourself" was released as a promotional single on July 2, 2020; it peaked at number 56 on the Billboard Hot 100. "The Woo" was released as the album's second single on July 10, 2020, and accompanying music video, which Eif Rivera directed, was released on July 20, 2020; it features archival footage of Pop Smoke edited on vintage television screens, and shows 50 Cent and Ricch surrounded by expensive cars and bikini-clad women. The song peaked at number 11 on the Billboard Hot 100 and at number nine on the UK singles chart, giving Pop Smoke his first top-10 hit in the United Kingdom; it was nominated for Song of Summer at the 2020 MTV Video Music Awards.

The album's third single "Mood Swings" was released on August 21, 2020. A visualizer for the track featuring Jordyn Woods, and Dylan and Dakota Gonzalez, was released on August 20, 2020. A music video for the song was directed by David wept and was released on October 7, 2020. It shows Lil Tjay and Lala Baptiste in an on-and-off relationship, and pictures of Pop Smoke in an eternal blue flame. A remix featuring the voice of American singer Summer Walker was released as a single on September 18, 2020. "Mood Swings" reached number 17 on the Billboard Hot 100 and number five on the UK Singles Chart, giving Pop Smoke his second top-10 hit in the UK. "For the Night" was released as the album's fourth single on October 3, 2020; it peaked at number six on the Billboard Hot 100, giving Pop Smoke his first top-10 hit in the United States. The album's fifth single "What You Know Bout Love" was released on October 9, 2020. Oliver Cannon directed its music video, which was released on December 22, 2020. The video features never-before-seen clips of Pop Smoke and his fans performing the song's dance challenge on TikTok. It peaked at number nine on the Billboard Hot 100 and at number four on the UK Singles Chart, giving Pop Smoke his second top-10 hit in the US and his third top-10 hit in the UK. "Hello", featuring A Boogie wit da Hoodie, was released as the album's sixth single on February 9, 2021; it peaked at number 83 on the Billboard Hot 100.

A music video for "Got It on Me" was released to Pop Smoke's YouTube channel on July 3, 2020. A music video for "Aim for the Moon" was directed by Oliver Cannon and was released on October 26, 2020. The visual pays tribute to the music video for the Notorious B.I.G.'s 1997 single "Sky's the Limit", while it features Bouba Savage playing Pop Smoke and an unnamed child playing Quavo as young versions of the rappers doing several activities. The remix of "Diana" received a music video which was released on October 14, 2020, and directed by Brilliant Garcia. The video is interspersed and features clips of dimly lit neon setups of Pop Smoke recording in the studio, and celebrating and dancing with his team, while it shows King Combs and Calboy hanging out with a crowd of friends in the streets of New York City, as well as being by luxury cars and women walking by them.

== Critical reception ==
Shoot for the Stars, Aim for the Moon ratings
Aggregate scores
Source	Rating
AnyDecentMusic?	6.4/10
Metacritic	70/100
Review scores
Source	Rating
AllMusic	2/5 stars
Consequence	B+
Entertainment Weekly	B
HipHopDX	4.1/5
The Independent	4/5 stars
NME	4/5 stars
Paste	7.2/10
Pitchfork	6.5/10
Rolling Stone	3.5/5 stars
Slant Magazine	2/5 stars

Shoot for the Stars, Aim for the Moon was met with generally positive reviews. At Metacritic, which assigns a normalized rating out of 100 to reviews from professional publications, the album received an average score of 70 based on 13 reviews, indicating "generally favorable reviews". Aggregator AnyDecentMusic? gave it 6.4 out of 10 based on their assessment of the critical consensus.

Dhruva Balram of NME wrote the album has many strengths, including its production, featured guests' verses, and Pop Smoke's lyrics. He said the album stands out because it "serves as a testament to the strength, power and knowledge [Pop] Smoke held in his ambition to go to the very top". For The Independent, Roisin O'Connor said the album is "not only a celebration, but an elegy for what else [Pop Smoke] could have achieved", and that it is the work of "someone whose success should have been stratospheric". Reviewing Shoot for the Stars, Aim for the Moon for Entertainment Weekly, Gary Suarez stated even if the album is not what Pop Smoke had created, he sounds alive on it, calling him a "motivated and vibrant hip-hop talent actively pushing towards that next level". Mike Milenko from Clash wrote Pop Smoke would have taken the album in a different direction with "less digitisation of the vocals", and that the use of autotune on almost every song "can become overpowering at times, but it all depends on your taste". David Aaron Brake from HipHopDX stated Shoot for the Stars, Aim for the Moon offers a "fleeting peek" into the career Pop Smoke would have had, saying it would "become—beyond Drill, beyond Brooklyn, beyond even the United States".

Alphonse Pierre of Pitchfork wrote the album "attempts to cement his legacy by expanding his world", praising it for being "big, polished, versatile, feature-packed, and loaded with radio and playlist-friendly records". Jade Gomez of Paste said the album "seeks to provide closure for [Brooklyn] while also showing the heartbreaking reality of what could've been", and that it would have been just as "satisfying with a condensed tracklist and more carefully curated features". Vulture's Craig Jenkins commented the album is "evidence of a star gaining his bearings, but as much as it is a product of a young and growing artist's path toward refinement, it is also a document of his jarring absence". In a mixed review, AllMusic's David Crone stated although the first two volumes of Meet the Woo lack the flatulent of Pop Smoke's iconic singles, they show quality as the representation of drill; he also said the album, in comparison, ruins the rapper's "visionary style with predatory glitz as everyone jumps for a piece of the pie". Slant Magazine's Charles Lyons-Burt said Shoot for the Stars, Aim for the Moon has the feel of a B-sides collection mashed together as a quick cash-in on his death, and that it attempts to expand Pop Smoke's sound and ambitions. He concluded by saying the album lost sight of the "local specificity, quirky charisma, and energy that made a name for Pop Smoke in the first place".

=== Year-end lists ===
Select year-end rankings of Shoot for the Stars, Aim for the Moon
Critic/Publication	List	Rank	Ref.
BeatRoute	Top 20 Albums of 2020	11	
Billboard	The 20 Best Rap Albums of 2020	2	
Complex	The Best Albums of 2020	10	
Far Out Magazine	The 50 Best Albums of 2020	42	
Highsnobiety	The 20 Albums That Saved 2020	14	
Man of Many	30 Best Albums of 2020	18	
The New York Times	Jon Caramanica's Best Albums of 2020	7	
NPR	Sidney Madden's Top 10 Albums of 2020	2	
The Ringer	The Ringer's Top 10 Albums of 2020	10	

== Industry awards ==
Shoot for the Stars, Aim for the Moon won Top Billboard 200 Album and Top Rap Album at the 2021 Billboard Music Awards. The album was nominated for Favorite Rap/Hip Hop Album while "What You Know Bout Love" was nominated for Favorite Rap/Hip Hop Song at the 2021 American Music Awards. "What You Know Bout Love" was further nominated for Hip-Hop Song of the Year at the 2022 iHeartRadio Music Awards. "For the Night" was nominated for Best Collaboration at the 2021 BET Awards. Canadian producer WondaGurl won Jack Richardson Producer of the Year Award for her production work on "Aim for the Moon" at the 2021 Juno Awards.

Awards and nominations for Shoot for the Stars, Aim for the Moon
Ceremony	Year	Category	Result	Ref.
Danish Music Awards	2020	International Album of the Year	Nominated	
American Music Awards	2021	Favorite Rap/Hip Hop Album	Nominated	
ARIA Music Awards	2021	Best International Artist (Shoot for the Stars, Aim for the Moon)	Nominated	
Billboard Music Awards	2021	Top Billboard 200 Album	Won	
Billboard Music Awards	2021	Top Rap Album	Won	
Juno Awards	2021	International Album of the Year	Nominated	

== Commercial performance ==
Shoot for the Stars, Aim for the Moon debuted at number one on the US Billboard 200 with first-week sales of 251,000 album-equivalent units, giving Pop Smoke his first number one album in the US. The album also accumulated 268.44 million on-demand streams of its tracks in the week ending July 18. Pop Smoke became the first hip-hop act to debut posthumously at number one on the Billboard 200 with his debut studio album. Pop Smoke also joined the Notorious B.I.G., 2Pac, and XXXTentacion as the only hip-hop acts to posthumously reach number one. All of the album's 19 tracks charted on the Billboard Hot 100 following its first week of release, making Pop Smoke have the most simultaneous entries on the Hot 100 posthumously. The album returned to number one on the Billboard 200 in October 2020 after a three-month break. It was the second album in 2020 after Lil Baby's My Turn to have a lengthy hiatus between weeks at number one. The album charted in the top five on the Billboard 200 for a total of 34 weeks, becoming only the fourth album in the 21st century to spend so many weeks in top five. Shoot for the Stars, Aim for the Moon also topped the US Top R&B/Hip-Hop Albums chart and remained at number one for 19 non-consecutive weeks. The album has spent the longest time at number one since MC Hammer's Please Hammer Don't Hurt 'Em in 1990. In March 2021, the album became the longest-running number-one record on the Billboard Top Rap Albums chart with 20 non-consecutive weeks, replacing American rapper Eminem's record after his seventh studio album Recovery spent 19 weeks at number one in 2010 and 2011.

Shoot for the Stars, Aim for the Moon debuted at number two on the UK Albums Chart, which was the highest-charting international debut rap album since 50 Cent's Get Rich or Die Tryin' in 2003. 12 weeks after its debut, the album rose to number one, becoming the first debut album to reach the top spot in 2020, and gave the late rapper his first number one album in the United Kingdom. Pop Smoke became the first solo artist to have a posthumous debut album reach number one. It took 12 weeks for Shoot for the Stars, Aim for the Moon to reach number one, becoming the longest album to reach the summit on the chart in six years, since English singer George Ezra's debut album Wanted on Voyage took 14 weeks to top the chart in 2014. Pop Smoke claimed the biggest debut album of 2020 in the UK with 222,000 chart sales. In Ireland, the album debuted at number one, giving Pop Smoke his first number one album in the country. It became the first debut album by an American rapper to top the Official Irish Charts in the 21st century. The rapper became the only artist to ever claim a posthumous debut album in Ireland. Pop Smoke also became the first artist in Ireland to have a posthumous number one album in more than four years. Shoot for the Stars, Aim for the Moon became the Official Irish Charts biggest debut album that was released in 2020.

Elsewhere, Shoot for the Stars, Aim for the Moon debuted at number one on the Canadian Albums Chart. The album topped the ARIA Albums chart in Australia, giving the late rapper his first number one album in the country. The album became the first posthumous record to top the ARIA Albums chart in more than two years since Australian musician Geoffrey Gurrumul Yunupingu's fourth studio album Djarimirri in April 2018. Pop Smoke became the 158th American artist to have an album top the charts in Australia. Three tracks of Shoot for the Stars, Aim for the Moon debuted within the top-50 of the ARIA Singles chart. The album reached number one on the album charts of Austria, Denmark, the Netherlands, Finland, New Zealand, Norway, and Switzerland.

== Track listing ==
Shoot for the Stars, Aim for the Moon standard edition
No.	Title	Writer(s)	Producer(s)	Length
1.	"Bad Bitch from Tokyo" (Intro)	Bashar Jackson; Andre Loblack; Ebony Oshunrinde; Julius Alexander-Brown	808Melo; WondaGurl; Jenius Level^{[b]}	0:48
2.	"Aim for the Moon" (featuring Quavo)	B. Jackson; Quavious Marshall; Oshunrinde; Sadiki Forbes; Loblack; Daniel Deleyto; Tyrone Penman; Dylan Cleary-Krell	WondaGurl; 5ive Beatz; 808Melo; Dani^{[a]}; Tyy Beats^{[b]}; Dez Wright^{[b]}	2:56
3.	"For the Night" (featuring Lil Baby and DaBaby)	B. Jackson; Dominique Jones; Jonathan Kirk; Alex Petit; Christoffer Marcussen; Cedric Leutwyler	CashMoneyAP; Palaze; Jess Jackson^{[b]}; Mike Dean^{[b]}; Wylo^{[b]}	3:10
4.	"44 Bulldog"	B. Jackson; David Gbeminiyi; Fabian Mora, Jr.	MobzBeatz; Mora Beats	2:31
5.	"Gangstas"	B. Jackson; Petit; Ellis Newton	CashMoneyAP; Swirv	2:40
6.	"Yea Yea"	B. Jackson; Hakan Akyol; Joseph Boyden	Hakz Beats; SephGotTheWaves	3:06
7.	"Creature" (featuring Swae Lee)	B. Jackson; Khalif Brown; Loblack; Martin Pitt; Philipp Riebenstahl; Newton; Steven Victor; Ryan Press; Jerome Eversley	808Melo; PittThaKid^{[a]}; Yung Swisher^{[a]}; Swirv^{[b]}	3:23
8.	"Snitching" (featuring Quavo and Future)	B. Jackson; Q. Marshall; Nayvadius Wilburn; Tyron Douglas; Seth Jones	Buddah Bless; Seth Da Chef	4:19
9.	"Make It Rain" (featuring Rowdy Rebel)	B. Jackson; Chad Marshall; Alyamani Ouadah	Yamaica	3:22
10.	"The Woo" (featuring 50 Cent and Roddy Ricch)	B. Jackson; Curtis Jackson III; Rodrick Moore, Jr.; Loblack; John Lucas; Adam Hashim; J. Jackson	808Melo; JW Lucas^{[a]}; Rxcksta^{[a]}; DJ Drewski^{[b]}; K-Mack^{[b]}; Ray Lennon^{[b]}; Billy J^{[b]}; J. Jackson^{[b]}	3:22
11.	"West Coast Shit" (featuring Tyga and Quavo)	B. Jackson; Micheal Stevenson; Q. Marshall; Dijon McFarlane; Uforo Ebong	Mustard; BongoByTheWay	3:12
12.	"Enjoy Yourself" (featuring Karol G)	B. Jackson; Carolina Giraldo; Richard Butler, Jr.^{[e]}; Karim Kharbouch^{[e]}; Pierre Meador^{[e]}; Marcussen; Lucas Grob	Palaze; Luci G	3:18
13.	"Mood Swings" (featuring Lil Tjay)	B. Jackson; Tione Merritt; Omar Gomez; DeAndre Sumpter	Beat Menace; Dizzy Banko; Kiwi^{[a]}	3:33
14.	"Something Special"	B. Jackson; Kenneth Ifill; Lionel Richie^{[f]}; Ronald LaPread^{[f]}; Tim Kelley^{[f]}; Tamia Washington^{[f]}; Ernesto Shaw^{[f]}; John Jackson^{[f]}	Kdi	2:38
15.	"What You Know Bout Love"	B. Jackson; Tashim Zene; Elgin Lumpkin^{[g]}; Troy Oliver^{[g]}	IAmTash	2:40
16.	"Diana" (featuring King Combs)	B. Jackson; Christian Combs; Anthony Blagmon; Stephen Garrett^{[h]}; Timothy Mosley^{[h]}; Pierre Rene, Jr.	SpunkBigga	3:09
17.	"Got It on Me"	B. Jackson; Dmytro Luchko; C. Jackson III^{[i]}; Darrell Branch^{[i]}; Frederick Perren; Luis Resto^{[i]}; Keni St. Lewis	Young Devante	2:45
18.	"Tunnel Vision" (Outro)	B. Jackson; Jugraj Nagra; Carson Hackney	808Melo; Nagra; Hackney	2:13
19.	"Dior" (bonus track)	B. Jackson; Loblack	808Melo	3:36
Total length:				56:41

Deluxe edition (bonus tracks)
No.	Title	Writer(s)	Producer(s)	Length
20.	"Hotel Lobby"	B. Jackson; Loblack; J. Jackson; C. Jackson III^{[j]}; Andre Young^{[j]}; Michael Elizondo^{[j]}; Theron Feemster^{[j]}	808Melo; J. Jackson; Keanu Beats^{[d]}; Banshee the Great^{[d]}	2:31
21.	"Showin Off Pt. 1" (featuring Fivio Foreign)	Bashar Jackson; Maxie Ryles III; Loblack	808Melo	1:36
22.	"Showin Off Pt. 2" (featuring Fivio Foreign)	B. Jackson; Ryles III; Manalla Yusuf; Szymon Świątczak	Szamz; Axl^{[a]}	3:12
23.	"Iced Out Audemars" (featuring Dafi Woo)	B. Jackson; Khadafi Julio; Ricardo Lamarre; John Stevens	Rico Beats; BigBroLGND^{[b]}	3:03
24.	"Woo Year" (featuring Dread Woo)	B. Jackson; Jahkeem Haughton; Petit; Kiowa Roukema; Cleary-Krell	CashMoneyAP; YoungKio; Dez Wright^{[b]}; Fabio Aguilar^{[d]}	3:02
25.	"Tsunami" (featuring Davido)	B. Jackson; David Adeleke; Loblack	808Melo	3:29
26.	"Backseat" (featuring PnB Rock)	B. Jackson; Rakim Allen; Michael Tucker	BloodPop	2:51
27.	"Imperfections" (Interlude)	B. Jackson; Damil Coste; Joseph Zoumboulias; Shaffer Smith^{[k]}; Kameron Houff^{[k]}; Scott Storch^{[k]}	Band on the Beat	1:48
28.	"She Feelin Nice" (featuring Jamie Foxx)	B. Jackson; Eric Bishop; Joseph Bereal; James Smith; Oshunrinde; RD Whittington	WondaGurl; Whittington^{[b]}; Lonny Bereal^{[c]}	2:35
29.	"Paranoia" (featuring Gunna and Young Thug)	B. Jackson; Sergio Kitchens; Jeffery Williams; Loblack; Keven Wolfsohn; Paul Goller	The Elements; 808Melo^{[b]}	3:33
30.	"Hello" (featuring A Boogie wit da Hoodie)	B. Jackson; Artist Dubose; Petit; Lamarre; Jason Avalos	CashMoneyAP; Rico Beats; L3gion^{[b]}	3:11
31.	"Be Clearr"	B. Jackson; Gerail Harvey	Relly Made	3:22
32.	"Yea Yea" (Remix; featuring Queen Naija)	B. Jackson; Queen Bulls; Akyol; Boyden	Hakz Beats; SephGotTheWaves	3:37
33.	"Diana" (Remix; featuring King Combs and Calboy)	B. Jackson; Combs; Calvin Woods; Blagmon; Garrett; Mosley; Rene	SpunkBigga	3:54
34.	"Enjoy Yourself" (Remix; featuring Burna Boy)	B. Jackson; Damini Ogulu; Butler, Jr.; Kharbouch; Meador; Marcussen; Grob	Palaze; Luci G	3:18
Total length:				101:44

Target edition (bonus tracks)
No.	Title	Writer(s)	Producer(s)	Length
20.	"Hello" (featuring A Boogie wit da Hoodie)	B. Jackson; Dubose; Petit; Lamarre; Avalos	CashMoneyAP; Rico Beats; L3gion^{[b]}	3:11
21.	"Hotel Lobby"	B. Jackson; Loblack; J. Jackson; C. Jackson III^{[j]}; Young^{[j]}; Elizondo^{[j]}; Feemster^{[j]}	808Melo; J. Jackson; Keanu Beats^{[d]}; Banshee the Great^{[d]}	2:31

Notes

- ^{^[a]} signifies a co-producer
- ^{^[b]} signifies an additional producer
- ^{^[c]} signifies a vocal producer
- ^{^[d]} signifies an uncredited co-producer
- "Paranoia" featuring Gunna and Young Thug was originally on the track list of the original album with an extra feature from Pusha T. However, it was included on the deluxe edition, without Pusha's verse.
- "Diana" features uncredited background vocals from Calboy on the original album, however features and credits him on the remix on the deluxe.

Sample credits

- "The Woo" contains uncredited interpolations from "Candy Shop", written by Curtis Jackson III and Scott Storch, as performed by 50 Cent.
- ^{^[e]} "Enjoy Yourself" contains interpolations from "Drink Freely", written by Richard Butler, Jr., Karim Kharbouch, and Pierre Meador, as performed by French Montana.
- ^{^[f]} "Something Special" contains samples from "Into You", written by Lionel Richie, Ronald LaPread, Tim Kelley, Tamia Washington, Ernesto Shaw, and John Jackson, as performed by Fabolous.
- ^{^[g]} "What You Know Bout Love" contains samples from "Differences", written by Elgin Lumpkin and Troy Oliver, as performed by Ginuwine.
- ^{^[h]} "Diana" contains excerpts from "Cheers 2 U", written by Stephen Garrett and Timothy Mosley, as performed by Playa.
- ^{^[i]} "Got It on Me" contains interpolations from "Many Men (Wish Death)", written by Curtis Jackson III, Darrell Branch, and Luis Resto, as performed by 50 Cent.
- ^{^[j]} "Hotel Lobby" contains resung elements from "If I Can't", written by Curtis Jackson III, Andre Young, Mike Elizondo, and Theron Feemster, as performed by 50 Cent.
- ^{^[k]} "Imperfections" contains interpolations from "Let Me Love You", written by Shaffer Smith, Kameron Houff, and Scott Storch, as performed by Mario.

== Personnel ==
Credits adapted from the album's liner notes.

Vocals

- Pop Smoke – rap vocals
- Quavo – rap vocals (2, 8, 11)
- Lil Baby – rap vocals (3)
- DaBaby – rap vocals (3)
- Swae Lee – rap vocals (7)
- Future – rap vocals (8)
- Rowdy Rebel – rap vocals (9)
- 50 Cent – rap vocals (10)
- Roddy Ricch – rap vocals (10)
- Tyga – rap vocals (11)
- Karol G – vocals (12)
- Lil Tjay – rap vocals (13)
- King Combs – rap vocals (16, 33)
- Calboy – background vocals (16), rap vocals (33)
- Dread – background vocals (18)
- Fivio Foreign – rap vocals (21, 22)
- Lauren "Laya" Ayala – background vocals (22)
- Dafi Woo – rap vocals (23)
- Dread Woo – rap vocals (24)
- Davido – vocals (25)
- PnB Rock – rap vocals (26)
- Jamie Foxx – vocals (28)
- Gunna – rap vocals (29)
- Young Thug – rap vocals (29)
- A Boogie wit da Hoodie – rap vocals (30)
- Queen Naija – vocals (32)
- Burna Boy – rap vocals (34)

Additional personnel

- Jess Jackson – mastering engineer (all tracks), mixer (1–7, 9–18, 20–34), engineer (13), programming (20)
- Leslie Brathwaite – mixer, engineer (8)
- Rob Kinelski – mixer, vocal engineer (12, 34)
- Ken "Duro" Ifill – mixer, programming (14)
- Jaycen Joshua – mixer (19)
- Corey "Cutz" Nutile – engineer (1–9, 12–16, 18, 20–34)
- Barrington Hall – engineer (2)
- Nate Alford – engineer (2, 30)
- Princeston "Perfect Harmany" Terry – engineer (3)
- Stephen "DotCom" Farrow – engineer (3)
- Jason Goldberg – engineer (10)
- Ky Miller – engineer (10, 17)
- Sage Skofield – engineer (13)
- Dom Martin – engineer (15, 17)
- Shawn "Source" Jarrett – engineer (16, 33)
- Yung Ave – engineer (17, 19)
- Vic Wainstein – engineer (19)
- Bart Schoudel – engineer (26)
- Dante Dow – engineer (28)
- Robert Ulsh – engineer (29)
- Alex Estevez – engineer (30)
- Thomas "Tillie" Mann – vocal mixer (3)
- Derek "MixedByAli" Ali – vocal mixer (10)
- Randy Lanphear – vocal engineer (7)
- A. "Bainz" Bains – vocal engineer (29)
- Florian "Flo" Ongonga – vocal engineer (29)
- TheElements – vocal engineer (29)
- Rose Adams – assistant mixer (1–7, 9–18, 20–34)
- Sage Skofield – assistant mixer (1–7, 9–18, 20–34)
- Sean Solymar – assistant mixer (1–7, 9–18, 20–34)
- DJ Riggins – assistant mixer (19)
- Jacob Richards – assistant mixer (19)
- Mike Seaberg – assistant mixer (19)
- Todd Cooper – additional mixer (14)
- Pierre Rogue – assistant recording engineer (15, 17)
- Andre Loblack – programming (1, 2, 7, 10, 19–21, 25, 29, 30)
- Daniel Deleyto – programming (2)
- Dylan Cleary Krell – programming (2)
- Ebony Oshunrinde – programming (2, 28)
- Sadiki Forbes – programming (2)
- Tyrone Penman – programming (2)
- Alex Petit – programming (3, 5, 24, 30)
- Christoffer Buchardt Marcussen – programming (3, 12, 34)
- Daniel Moras Raab – programming (3)
- David Gbeminiyi – programming (4)
- Fabian Mora – programming (4)
- Ellis Newton – programming (5)
- Hakz Beats – programming (6, 32)
- SephGotTheWaves – programming (6, 32)
- Seth Jones – programming (8)
- Tyron Douglas – programming (8)
- Alyamani Ouadah – programming (9)
- Dijon McFarlane – programming (11)
- Uforo Ebong – programming (11)
- Lucas Grob – programming (12, 34)
- Deandre Sumpter – programming (13)
- Omar Gomez – programming (13)
- Tashim Zene – programming (15)
- Anthony Blagmon – programming (16, 33)
- Dmytro Luchko – programming (17)
- Carson Hackney – programming (18)
- Jugraj Nagra – programming (18)
- Manalla Yusuf – programming (22)
- Szymon Swiatczak – programming (22)
- BigBroLGND – programming (23)
- Rico Beats – programming (23, 30)
- Kiowa Roukema – programming (24)
- Rob Harris – guitar (25)
- Hal Ritson – keyboards, programming (25)
- Michele Balduzzi – keyboards, programming (25)
- Richard Adlam – keyboards, programming (25)
- Graeme Blevins – melodica (25)
- BloodPop – programming (26)
- Damil Coste – programming (27)
- Joseph Zoumboulias – programming (27)
- RD Whittington – programming (28)
- Keren Wolfsohn – programming (29)
- Paul Bogumi Goller – programming (29)
- Jason Avalos – programming (30)
- Gerail Harvey – programming (31)

== Charts ==
=== Weekly charts ===
2020 chart performance for Shoot for the Stars, Aim for the Moon
Chart (2020)	Peak position
Australian Albums (ARIA)	1
Austrian Albums (Ö3 Austria)	1
Belgian Albums (Ultratop Flanders)	2
Belgian Albums (Ultratop Wallonia)	3
Canadian Albums (Billboard)	1
Czech Albums (ČNS IFPI)	4
Danish Albums (Hitlisten)	1
Dutch Albums (Album Top 100)	1
Finnish Albums (Suomen virallinen lista)	1
French Albums (SNEP)	3
German Albums (Offizielle Top 100)	9
Irish Albums (Official Charts)	1
Italian Albums (FIMI)	9
Lithuanian Albums (AGATA)	5
New Zealand Albums (RMNZ)	1
Norwegian Albums (VG-lista)	1
Spanish Albums (Promusicae)	26
Swedish Albums (Sverigetopplistan)	3
Swiss Albums (Schweizer Hitparade)	1
UK Albums (Official Charts)	1
US Billboard 200	1
US Top R&B/Hip-Hop Albums (Billboard)	1

2024 chart performance for Shoot for the Stars, Aim for the Moon
Chart (2024)	Peak position
Nigerian Albums (TurnTable)	72

=== Year-end charts ===
2020 year-end chart performance for Shoot for the Stars, Aim for the Moon
Chart (2020)	Position
Australian Albums (ARIA)	11
Austrian Albums (Ö3 Austria)	20
Belgian Albums (Ultratop Flanders)	14
Belgian Albums (Ultratop Wallonia)	38
Canadian Albums (Billboard)	3
Danish Albums (Hitlisten)	3
Dutch Albums (Album Top 100)	1
French Albums (SNEP)	48
German Albums (Offizielle Top 100)	71
Icelandic Albums (Tónlistinn)	3
Irish Albums (IRMA)	8
Italian Albums (FIMI)	50
New Zealand Albums (RMNZ)	4
Swedish Albums (Sverigetopplistan)	12
Swiss Albums (Schweizer Hitparade)	10
UK Albums (OCC)	6
US Billboard 200	7
US Top R&B/Hip-Hop Albums (Billboard)	5

2021 year-end chart performance for Shoot for the Stars, Aim for the Moon
Chart (2021)	Position
Australian Albums (ARIA)	11
Austrian Albums (Ö3 Austria)	11
Belgian Albums (Ultratop Flanders)	13
Belgian Albums (Ultratop Wallonia)	51
Canadian Albums (Billboard)	3
Danish Albums (Hitlisten)	6
Dutch Albums (Album Top 100)	8
French Albums (SNEP)	44
German Albums (Offizielle Top 100)	46
Icelandic Albums (Tónlistinn)	7
Irish Albums (IRMA)	19
Italian Albums (FIMI)	54
New Zealand Albums (RMNZ)	4
Norwegian Albums (VG-lista)	5
Swedish Albums (Sverigetopplistan)	33
Swiss Albums (Schweizer Hitparade)	14
UK Albums (OCC)	15
US Billboard 200	3
US Top R&B/Hip-Hop Albums (Billboard)	1

2022 year-end chart performance for Shoot for the Stars, Aim for the Moon
Chart (2022)	Position
Australian Albums (ARIA)	28
Austrian Albums (Ö3 Austria)	38
Belgian Albums (Ultratop Flanders)	44
Belgian Albums (Ultratop Wallonia)	96
Canadian Albums (Billboard)	19
Danish Albums (Hitlisten)	27
Dutch Albums (Album Top 100)	27
French Albums (SNEP)	107
German Albums (Offizielle Top 100)	79
Icelandic Albums (Tónlistinn)	47
Lithuanian Albums (AGATA)	93
New Zealand Albums (RMNZ)	9
Swedish Albums (Sverigetopplistan)	96
Swiss Albums (Schweizer Hitparade)	47
UK Albums (OCC)	46
US Billboard 200	26
US Top R&B/Hip-Hop Albums (Billboard)	13

2023 year-end chart performance for Shoot for the Stars, Aim for the Moon
Chart (2023)	Position
Australian Albums (ARIA)	54
Belgian Albums (Ultratop Flanders)	82
Belgian Albums (Ultratop Wallonia)	127
Canadian Albums (Billboard)	36
Danish Albums (Hitlisten)	64
Dutch Albums (Album Top 100)	57
French Albums (SNEP)	182
New Zealand Albums (RMNZ)	17
Swiss Albums (Schweizer Hitparade)	49
UK Albums (OCC)	99
US Billboard 200	67
US Top R&B/Hip-Hop Albums (Billboard)	31

2024 year-end chart performance for Shoot for the Stars, Aim for the Moon
Chart (2024)	Position
Australian Hip Hop/R&B Albums (ARIA)	27
Belgian Albums (Ultratop Flanders)	110
Belgian Albums (Ultratop Wallonia)	192
Swiss Albums (Schweizer Hitparade)	79
US Billboard 200	192

2025 year-end chart performance for Shoot for the Stars, Aim for the Moon
Chart (2025)	Position
Belgian Albums (Ultratop Flanders)	183

== Certifications ==
Certifications and sales for Shoot for the Stars, Aim for the Moon
Region	Certification	Certified units/sales
Australia (ARIA)	Platinum	70,000^{‡}
Belgium (BRMA)	Gold	10,000^{‡}
Canada (Music Canada)	3× Platinum	240,000^{‡}
Denmark (IFPI Danmark)	5× Platinum	100,000^{‡}
France (SNEP)	3× Platinum	300,000^{‡}
Germany (BVMI)	Gold	100,000^{‡}
Iceland (FHF)	Gold	2,500
Italy (FIMI)	Platinum	50,000^{‡}
New Zealand (RMNZ)	5× Platinum	75,000^{‡}
Poland (ZPAV)	Platinum	20,000^{‡}
Portugal (AFP)	Platinum	7,000^{‡}
Sweden (GLF)	Platinum	30,000^{‡}
United Kingdom (BPI)	2× Platinum	600,000^{‡}
United States (RIAA)	2× Platinum	2,000,000^{‡}
^{‡} Sales+streaming figures based on certification alone.

== Release history ==
Release dates and formats for Shoot for the Stars, Aim for the Moon
Region	Date	Label(s)	Format(s)	Edition	Ref.
Various	July 3, 2020	Victor Victor; Republic	Digital download; streaming	Standard	
Various	July 20, 2020	Victor Victor; Republic	Digital download; streaming	Deluxe	
Various	July 24, 2020	Victor Victor; Republic	CD	Standard	
United States	August 7, 2020	Victor Victor; Republic	CD	Target	
Germany	November 20, 2020	Victor Victor; Republic	CD	Deluxe	
Japan	November 27, 2020	Victor Victor; Republic	Cassette	Standard	
Various	January 15, 2021	Victor Victor; Republic	Vinyl	Standard	
South Korea	January 22, 2021	Victor Victor; Republic	CD	Deluxe	
Various	February 5, 2021	Victor Victor; Republic	Vinyl	Deluxe	
