= Tunnel Vision (Pop Smoke song) =

2020 song by Pop Smoke

"Tunnel Vision (Outro)"

Song by Pop Smoke

from the album Shoot for the Stars, Aim for the Moon
- Released: July 3, 2020
- Genre: Drill
- Length: 2:12
- Label: Victor Victor; Republic
- Songwriters: Bashar Jackson; Andre Loblack; Carson Hackney; Jugraj Nagra
- Producers: 808Melo; Carson Hackney; Nagra

"Tunnel Vision (Outro)" is a drill song by American rapper Pop Smoke from his posthumous debut studio album, Shoot for the Stars, Aim for the Moon (2020). The song was written by Pop Smoke, known as Bashar Jackson, alongside 808Melo, who has the real name of Andre Loblack, Jugraj Nagra, and Carson Hackney. It was produced by the latter three. The original melody of the song is called "Wild West" and had a Western flute over it. In the lyrics, Pop Smoke raps about looking towards his future and wanting to have an impact on the music industry.

The song received positive reviews from music critics, who generally expressed it as menacing. "Tunnel Vision (Outro)" peaked at number 79 on the US Billboard Hot 100, while it reached number 43 on the US Hot R&B/Hip-Hop Songs chart and number 57 on the Canadian Hot 100. In November 2020, journalist Victoria Inoyo filed a lawsuit against Victor Victor Worldwide, Universal Music Group, Republic Records, and Warner Chappell Music, Inc, alleging they used an interview she conducted with Pop Smoke at the Rolling Loud music festival in December 2019 on the song without her permission or payment.

== Background ==
Producer Carson Hackney sent a sample of the song to fellow producer Nagra. He added flute, mixed the song, and did some structuring to the sample. The producer then sent it to 808Melo. The original melody of the song, created by Hackney, is called "Wild West" and had a Western concert flute over it. 808Melo played the song's beat for Pop Smoke when they were recording in the Bahamas; the track had 808Melo's signature sounds on it. Pop Smoke found it challenging to record the song because of the melody and when 808Melo played the song, Pop Smoke said: "Um, I like it, but I don't know." 808Melo was going to scrap the beat, until Pop Smoke wanted to record the song. Nagra called Hackney and explained he had heard a snippet of the song and immediately knew that it started with his original melody. At the end of the phone call, he told Hackey that the song was going to end up on the album. The song was written by Pop Smoke, known as Bashar Jackson, alongside 808Melo, who has the real name of Andre Loblack, Jugraj Nagra, and Carson Hackney. It was produced by the latter three.

== Composition and reception ==
Musically, "Tunnel Vision (Outro)" is a drill track. Pop Smoke shouts out his best friend Mike Dee at the beginning of the song. Gary Suarez of Entertainment Weekly depicted the song "pulls 808's signature bass wobble from their popular 2019 single 'Dior'". NME's Dhruva Balram opined the song shows Pop Smoke "looking towards a future he never had". Towards the end of "Tunnel Vision (Outro)", an interviewer asks serious questions to Pop Smoke: "What do you want your impact to be on the music industry?/Like, a hundred years from now, how do you want people to remember you?/Pop Smoke did this, he did that, he did what?" Pop Smoke responds confidently: "Pop Smoke came in and changed the game/Pop Smoke came in and showed them niggas a new vibe/You know, the whole sound, the whole vibe, the whole movement/Different."

A.D. Amorosi of Variety described the song as "ambient", while Suarez called it "menacing". Paul Thompson from GQ said "Tunnel Vision (Outro)" "stomp[s] as hard as the best Pop Smokes songs do". David Crone of AllMusic lauded the song as "excellent", and said Pop Smoke's "sheer charisma still manages to cut through". Bianca Gracie of Paper magazine deemed the song "foreboding". Following the release of Shoot for the Stars, Aim for the Moon, "Tunnel Vision (Outro)" debuted and peaked at number 79 on the US Billboard Hot 100. The song simultaneously peaked at number 43 on the US Hot R&B/Hip-Hop Songs chart and number 57 on the Canadian Hot 100.

== Lawsuit ==
On November 24, 2020, journalist Victoria Inoyo filed a lawsuit against Victor Victor Worldwide, Universal Music Group, Republic Records, and Warner Chappell Music, Inc, alleging they used an interview she did with Pop Smoke at the Rolling Loud music festival on December 14, 2019, in Los Angeles for "Tunnel Vision (Outro)" without her permission. Court documents say that Inoyo used her own questions during the interview, which Pop Smoke responded to on video footage that was recorded by her team. On January 6, 2020, she allegedly "fixed" and "published" the interview she conducted on her YouTube channel: Vicky's View. The lawsuit says that she owns the copyright for the interview, which has her own voice and Pop Smoke's answers. On June 16, 2020, a representative from Republic Records talked to Inoyo, asking for her permission to include the interview, her vocals, and/or her appearance on the album.

The court documents further state Inoyo was only offered one dollar to use her interview on Shoot for the Stars, Aim for the Moon. Inoyo was very interested in having her interview with the rapper appear on the album but wanted to negotiate the terms and compensation. She spoke with another representative from Republic Records on June 22, 2020, to discuss another offer, but was informed that the deadline for the album was two days later. Inoyo was told that on June 23 the label would no longer be using her vocals, and she assumed that the interview would not be used either. Inoyo claimed that 12 percent of the song, which translates to around 16 seconds, was used in the song. She is suing for copyright infringement, unjust enrichment, 1.5 million dollars in damages, credit as a writer on Shoot for the Stars, Aim for the Moon, and a percentage of the publishing income earned from it.

== Credits and personnel ==
Credits adapted from Tidal.

- Pop Smoke – vocals, songwriter
- 808Melo – production, songwriter
- Carson Hackney – production, programming, songwriter
- Nagra – production, programming, songwriter
- Jess Jackson – mixing engineer, mastering engineer
- Corey Nutile – recording engineer
- Rose Adams – assistant engineer
- Sage Skofield – assistant engineer
- Sean Solymar – assistant engineer
- Dread – additional vocals, background vocals
- Mike Dee – additional vocals
- Xiarra Diamond Nimrod – additional vocals

== Charts ==
Weekly chart performance for "Tunnel Vision (Outro)"
| Chart (2020) | Peak position |
|---|---|
| Canada Hot 100 (Billboard) | 57 |
| US Billboard Hot 100 | 79 |
| US Hot R&B/Hip-Hop Songs (Billboard) | 43 |
