= Snitching (song) =

2020 song by Pop Smoke

Song by Pop Smoke featuring Quavo and Future

from the album Shoot for the Stars, Aim for the Moon
- Released: July 3, 2020
- Recorded: 2019 – 2020
- Genre: Trap
- Length: 4:19
- Label: Victor Victor; Republic
- Songwriters: Bashar Jackson; Quavious Marshall; Nayvadius Wilburn; Tyron Douglas; Seth Jones
- Producers: Buddah Bless; Seth the Chef

"Snitching" is a song by American rapper Pop Smoke featuring fellow American rappers Quavo of Migos and Future, from the former's posthumous debut studio album, Shoot for the Stars, Aim for the Moon (2020). The song was written by the artists alongside producers Buddah Bless and Seth the Chef,. Quavo was originally going to put the song on Migos' then-upcoming fourth studio album, Culture III. Before the song was created, it was inspired by fellow American rapper 6ix9ine.

"Snitching" is a trap song that sees Pop Smoke rap about the threats he faced every day during his life, while Quavo and Future rap to bring awareness to the traitors of the world. Critics praised the song's instrumentation, with some picking it as a highlight on Shoot for the Stars, Aim for the Moon. In the United States, the song reached number 54 on the Billboard Hot 100 and number 30 on the Hot R&B/Hip-Hop Songs chart, while it further peaked at number 51 on the Canadian Hot 100.

== Background ==
Before "Snitching" was created, the song was inspired by fellow rapper 6ix9ine, who was considered a snitch. The song's beat was created by American producers Buddah Bless and Seth the Chef. Buddah Bless originally did not make the beat for Pop Smoke because at the time, he was only just recording drill music. Quavo played "Snitching" to Buddah Bless and intended to put it on his hip hop trio Migos' upcoming fourth studio album Culture III. While Quavo was working on the song, Pop Smoke walked into the studio they were in and expressed a desire to be part of the song. Record executive Steven Victor at first reached out to Jay-Z to add a verse to the song but the rapper did not respond. Victor then reached out to Future, and the rapper agreed because he felt honored to be able to work with Pop Smoke. The song was written by Pop Smoke, known as Bashar Jackson, alongside Quavo, Future, Buddah Bless, and Seth the Chef, who have the respective real names of Quavious Marshall, Nayvadius Wilburn, Tyron Douglas, and Seth Jones.

== Music and lyrics ==
Musically, "Snitching" is a trap song. According to Karlton Jahmal of HotNewHipHop, the song's beat is made up of a "guitar riff sprinkled with a chime and peppered with stop and go percussions". Quavo raps two verses and the chorus, while Pop Smoke and Future both rap the third and fourth verses.

NME's Dhruva Balram noted Pop Smoke raps about the threats he faced in his everyday life and the measures he took to defend himself: "There's never a day I don't walk without it/Shoot a nigga, never talk about it (Shh)". Wongo Okon of Uproxx wrote that Quavo and Future "bring awareness to the traitors of the world". Briana Younger of NPR opined that Future appears to honor Pop Smoke by imitating him during the song. Quavo raps: "Look at my status, No, I'm not braggin', I'm not average, My bitch want a Patek, I bought her a whip and I told her, "Stop naggin'", Too much jewelry, my diamonds is blastin', I bought it off backend, The club is packed in, Step in your city we goin' in."

== Release and reception ==
On July 3, 2020, "Snitching" was released as the eighth track on Pop Smoke's posthumous debut studio album Shoot for the Stars, Aim for the Moon. Balram described the track as "straight-up icy". Earmilk's Ashton Howard and David Crone of AllMusic stated "Snitching" is one of the album's standouts and highlights, respectively. Writing for Vulture, Craig Jenkins commented the song "would've silenced anyone who tried to accuse Pop Smoke of being a one-dimensional artist". Jahmal opined that the song is one of the catchier tracks on the album, and said it has "a chorus that is easy to remember and sing". Gary Suarez of Entertainment Weekly called it disjointed. Following the release of Shoot for the Stars, Aim for the Moon, "West Coast Shit" debuted and peaked at number 54 on the US Billboard Hot 100. The song simultaneously peaked at number 30 on the US Hot R&B/Hip-Hop Songs chart and number 51 on the Canadian Hot 100. It further charted at number 122 in France.

== Credits and personnel ==
Credits adapted from Tidal.

- Pop Smoke – songwriter, vocals
- Quavo – songwriter, vocals
- Future – songwriter, vocals
- Buddah Bless – songwriter, production, programming
- Seth the Chef – songwriter, production, programming
- Jess Jackson – mastering engineer
- Leslie Brathwaite – mixing engineer, engineer
- Corey Nutile – engineer

== Charts ==
Weekly chart performance for "Snitching"
Chart (2020)	Peak position
Canada Hot 100 (Billboard)	51
France (SNEP)	122
US Billboard Hot 100	54
US Hot R&B/Hip-Hop Songs (Billboard)	30
