= West Coast Shit =

2020 song by Pop Smoke featuring Tyga and Quavo

Song by Pop Smoke featuring Tyga and Quavo

from the album Shoot for the Stars, Aim for the Moon
- Released: July 3, 2020
- Recorded: 2020
- Genre: Trap
- Length: 3:12
- Label: Victor Victor; Republic
- Songwriters: Bashar Jackson; Michael Stevenson; Quavious Marshall; Dijon McFarlane; Uforo Ebong
- Producers: Mustard; BongoByTheWay

"West Coast Shit" is a song by American rapper Pop Smoke, featuring fellow American rappers Tyga and Quavo, from the former of the three's posthumous debut studio album, Shoot for the Stars, Aim for the Moon (2020). The song was written by the artists alongside producers Mustard, and Bongo ByTheWay. Mustard passed the song onto Pop Smoke for him to put on the album.

"West Coast Shit" interpolates the lyrics of Too Short's "Shake That Monkey". In the lyrics of the song, Pop Smoke and Tyga rap about the wonders of the West Coast. The song received generally mixed reviews from music critics, with a number of them criticizing the song's production. In the United States, the song reached number 65 on the Billboard Hot 100 and number 37 on the Hot R&B/Hip-Hop Songs chart, while it further peaked at number 48 on the Canadian Hot 100.

== Background and recording ==
The night after the Off-White show in Paris during Paris Fashion Week, Pop Smoke could not sleep, and he and his team went to a recording studio at 11 p.m. Quavo and Mustard were in the next room, which they entered to start talking to them. Mustard then played a couple of songs, and "West Coast Shit" was one of the first that Pop Smoke made with him. Pop Smoke was very excited because it was the first time he met Mustard. Quavo called Mustard and told him to meet him in Paris, with the two playing different types of West Coast beats. Quavo said Pop Smoke was a New York drill rapper and didn't properly know how to rap on that kind of music. Quavo told Pop Smoke his voice was amazing, and that he could rap on anything. Pop Smoke said: "No, man. I'm going to sound like 50 Cent. I want to sound like Pop [Smoke]." Quavo responded with: "That's what I want you to sound like." "West Coast Shit" was originally supposed to be Mustard's song.

Record executive Steven Victor asked Mustard if they could put it on Pop Smoke's album, and he agreed. When they were listening to the track, Victor thought it would be a good idea to add Tyga because he and Pop Smoke were friends that would talk to each other all the time. Tyga was also in Paris, but he didn't show up to the studio because he got drunk and fell asleep. Victor sent the song to him later down the line and told him to record his part; Tyga recorded the part and sent it back to Victor. Tyga explained a song like "West Coast Shit" is his type of music, which is why he wanted to join. Pop Smoke and his team were trying to find takeout food late at night, and then they made the track. Upon the release of Shoot for the Stars, Aim for the Moon, fans of Pop Smoke criticized Tyga's appearance on the song, as well as Karol G's appearance on "Enjoy Yourself". Tyga shared attached screenshots of tweets on his Twitter account from February 2020, showing Pop Smoke asking him for a verse and asking for Karol G to be featured on the album as well.

== Writing and composition ==
The song was written by Pop Smoke, known as Bashar Jackson, alongside Quavo, Tyga, Mustard, and BongoByTheWay, who have the respective real names of Quavious Marshall, Michael Stevenson, Dijon McFarlane, and Uforo Ebong. The track was produced by Mustard and Bongo ByTheWay. "West Coast Shit" prominently interpolates the lyrics of Too Short's 2003 single, "Shake That Monkey", standing as one of several tracks from Shoot for the Stars, Aim for the Moon to utilize early 2000s songs. Slant Magazine's Charles Lyons-Burt said that "West Coast Shit" contains a "minimalist piano and snare combination". M.T. Richards, for Consequence of Sound, observed that Pop Smoke and Tyga rap about the miracles of the West Coast. Quavo raps: "Look, Pop Smoke, I'm on some west coast shit (Pop Smoke), In New York, I got a west coast bitch (West coast), Huncho on that west coast shit (Woo), Left wrist, both wrists, and some bricks (Woo)."

== Release and reception ==
On July 3, 2020, "West Coast Shit" was released as the 11th track on Pop Smoke's debut posthumous studio album Shoot for the Stars, Aim for the Moon. Roisin O'Connor of The Independent wrote that the song feels "paper-thin" when following "The Woo". A.D. Amorosi of Variety described "West Coast Shit" as a "so-so track". David Crone of AllMusic opined Tyga "squeez[es] his way ahead of the Quavo [and] Pop [Smoke]" throughout the whole song. Alphonse Pierre of Pitchfork called the song a "wannabe Cali-strip-club anthem". Lyons-Burt said the song's "production feels mournful rather than charged". Hannah Giorgis of The Atlantic commented the song is a "rare misfire, pushing Pop [Smoke] so far into commercial-sounding production that it overtakes his strongest sensibilities". Wongo Okon of Uproxx wrote that Pop Smoke "looks to appeal to the West Coast". Gary Suarez of Entertainment Weekly said Pop Smoke stands out on the song, and described it as an "inexplicably slight Mustard-helmed" track. Richards cited the song as a "bustling, cross-regional groove-athon". Following the release of Shoot for the Stars, Aim for the Moon, "West Coast Shit" debuted and peaked at number 65 on the US Billboard Hot 100. The song simultaneously peaked at number 37 on the US Hot R&B/Hip-Hop Songs chart and number 48 on the Canadian Hot 100. It further charted at number 153 in France.

== Credits and personnel ==
Credits adapted from Tidal.

- Pop Smoke – vocals, songwriter
- Quavo – vocals, songwriter
- Tyga – vocals, songwriter
- Mustard – production, programming, songwriter
- Bongo ByTheWay – production, programming, songwriter
- Jess Jackson – mastering engineer, mixing engineer
- Rose Adams – assistant mixing engineer
- Sage Skofield – assistant mixing engineer
- Sean Solymar – assistant mixing engineer

== Charts ==
Chart performance for "West Coast Shit"
Chart (2020)	Peak position
Canada Hot 100 (Billboard)	48
France (SNEP)	153
US Billboard Hot 100	65
US Hot R&B/Hip-Hop Songs (Billboard)	37
