= Diana (Pop Smoke song) =

2020 song by Pop Smoke featuring King Combs

Song by Pop Smoke featuring King Combs

from the album Shoot for the Stars, Aim for the Moon
- Released: July 3, 2020
- Recorded: February 18, 2020
- Genre: R&B
- Length: 3:09
- Label: Victor Victor; Republic
- Songwriters: Bashar Jackson; Christian Combs; Calvin Woods; Anthony Blagman; Pierre Rene Jr; Stephen Garrett; Timothy Mosley
- Producer: SpunkaBigga

Music video
- "Diana (Remix)" on YouTube

"Diana" is a song by American rapper Pop Smoke featuring rapper King Combs from the former's posthumous debut studio album, Shoot for the Stars, Aim for the Moon (2020). The remix featured on the deluxe edition of the album as well as the EP Mood Swings (2020). It features uncredited background vocals from Calboy. It was written by Pop Smoke, known as Bashar Jackson, alongside Calboy, King Combs, Anthony Blagman, Pierre Richard Rene Jr, Stephen Garrett, and Tim Mosley. The song was produced by SpunkaBigga.

"Diana" prominently samples the lyrics of Playa's "Cheers 2 U", while the lyrics are about Pop Smoke being full of lust and throwing a confident shot at love. Critics lauded Pop Smoke's performance but criticized King Combs' vocals. The song reached number 76 on the US Billboard Hot 100 and number 42 on the Hot R&B/Hip-Hop Songs chart, while it further peaked at number 71 on the Canadian Hot 100.

A remix of "Diana" that features Calboy was released on the deluxe version of the album on July 20, 2020. An accompanying music video was released on October 14, 2020, and directed by Brilliant Garcia. The visual is interspersed and features clips of Pop Smoke recording in the studio while celebrating and dancing with his team. King Comb and Calboy hang out with a crowd of friends in the streets of New York City near luxury cars and women. The video received positive reviews, with one critic saying it incorporates an R&B feel.

== Background and composition ==
"Diana" was made by Pop Smoke with King Combs the night before his murder. The two rappers were not recording in a booth, so everybody in the room had to be quiet for a couple of seconds while both of them recorded. Pop Smoke sent American producer SpunkBigga a rough draft of the song without King Combs on it; Pop Smoke ended up changing a couple of bars on his hook and the verse. They met up the night Pop Smoke was murdered and were in the studio all night, editing the song. King Combs recorded a new verse for it to go along with what Pop Smoke did. Calboy added ad-libs to the song because he was in the studio with Pop Smoke at one point, and was going to be on the record with him and King Combs. Both Pop Smoke and King Combs talked about when they were going to release the song. At first, King Combs was going to release it on Valentine's Day, but then Pop Smoke was deciding to release it. Both did not know when they wanted to release the song, but the two knew that they just wanted to shoot a music video for it. Pop Smoke's team decided to take Calboy's vocals out of the song but leave his ad-libs. Calboy criticized the team on his Twitter for removing him from the song. The song was written by Pop Smoke, known as Bashar Jackson, alongside Calboy, King Combs, Anthony Blagman, Pierre Richard Rene Jr, Stephen Garrett, and Tim Mosley.

The track was solely produced by SpunkaBigga. Music critics have described "Diana" as an R&B track. The song prominently samples the lyrics of Playa's 1998 single "Cheers 2 U", standing as one of several tracks from Shoot for the Stars, Aim for the Moon to sample early 2000s songs. Wongo Okon of Uproxx wrote that Pop Smoke takes a confident shot at love. Roisin O'Connor of The Independent mentioned that the rapper is full of lust during the track. Pop Smoke raps: "She said she wanna be a teacher/Damn, in my head she would look good as a teacher/Treat her with Balenciaga sneakers".

== Release and reception ==
On July 3, 2020, "Diana" was released as the 16th track on Pop Smoke's posthumous debut studio album Shoot for the Stars, Aim for the Moon. A remix for "Diana" featuring Calboy was later released on the deluxe version of the album on July 20, 2020. M.T. Richards, for Consequence of Sound called "Diana" a "lovestruck rendition of Playa's 'Cheers 2 U'", and said "it doesn't sound like [Pop] Smoke's heart is aflutter". David Crone of AllMusic said Pop Smoke isn't "even given the dignity of a first verse, with featured artists muscling their way in ahead of the late rapper on tracks like 'The Woo' and 'Diana'". Jade Gomez from Paste stated the song has "silky, sparkly New York-esque production that Pop Smoke so elegantly rides, but that magic is ruined by King Combs' mediocre delivery that could have easily been done by Pop [Smoke] himself". Briana Younger of NPR described the song as "romance-centric". August Brown of the Los Angeles Times said the song showcases Pop Smoke's range, which "[has] new open space and melody, with lyrics that are even sometimes tender". Danny Schwartz of Rolling Stone opined the song evokes 50 Cent. Following the release of Shoot for the Stars, Aim for the Moon, "Diana" debuted and peaked at number 76 on the US Billboard Hot 100. The song simultaneously peaked at number 42 on the US Hot R&B/Hip-Hop Songs chart and number 71 on the Canadian Hot 100.

== Music video ==
=== Background and synopsis ===
In an interview with HipHopDX, Calboy explained that he was originally going to shoot a music video with King Combs and Pop Smoke for "Diana" in Los Angeles, until they found out the day after that the latter had been murdered. A music video for the remix of "Diana" was later released on October 14, 2020. The video was directed by Brilliant Garcia. The visual is interspersed and features clips of dimly lit neon setups of Pop Smoke recording in the studio, and celebrating and dancing with his team. King Combs and Calboy also appear in the video. They are seen hanging out with a crowd of friends in the streets of New York City, as well as being by luxury cars and women walking by them.

=== Critical reception ===
The music video was met with positive reviews from critics. Writing for Hypebeast, Charlie Zhang opined that the visual "mirror[s] the chill and laidback groove of the song". He continued, saying that King Combs and Calboy appearing in New York City is "a fitting backdrop to celebrate the city where Pop Smoke grew up". Alex Zidel of HotNewHipHop stated that it was "only right for Pop Smoke's estate to offload another music video of the [song]". Natalie Malcolm of GRM Daily opined that with the track "sampling Playa's 90s track 'Cheers To You', the R&B feel is incorporated into the visuals".

== Credits and personnel ==
Credits adapted from Tidal.

- Pop Smoke – vocals, songwriter
- King Combs – vocals, songwriter
- Calboy – background vocals, songwriter
- Timbaland – songwriter
- Stephen Garrett – songwriter
- Pierre Richard Rene Jr – songwriter
- SpunkaBigga – production, programming, songwriter
- Jess Jackson – mastering engineer, mixing engineer
- Shawn Jerrett – recording engineer
- Corey Nutile – engineer
- Rose Adams – assistant mixing engineer
- Sage Skofield – assistant mixing engineer
- Sean Solymar – assistant mixing engineer

== Charts ==
Chart performance for "Diana"
Chart (2020)	Peak position
Canada Hot 100 (Billboard)	71
US Billboard Hot 100	76
US Hot R&B/Hip-Hop Songs (Billboard)	42
