= Many Men (Wish Death) =

2003 single by 50 Cent

Promotional single by 50 Cent

from the album Get Rich or Die Tryin'
- A-side: "21 Questions"
- Released: 2003
- Genre: Gangsta rap
- Length: 4:16
- Label: Shady; Aftermath; Interscope
- Songwriters: Curtis Jackson; Luis Resto; Darrell Branch; Freddie Perren; Keni St. Lewis
- Producers: Six Figga Digga; Eminem; Luis Resto (add.)

Music video
- "Many Men (Wish Death)" on YouTube

"Many Men (Wish Death)" is a song by American rapper 50 Cent from his debut studio album Get Rich or Die Tryin' (2003). The song was produced by Darrell "Digga" Branch, Eminem and Luis Resto. Despite the song charting and having a music video, it was only released as a promotional single.

== Background and recording ==
Darrell "Digga" Branch began working on the instrumental that eventually became "Many Men (Wish Death)" around "two or three years" prior to its official release. He developed it whilst working with The Diplomats on early material for their debut album Diplomatic Immunity (2003); however, the group never completed this song. The instrumental was then offered to Nas during the recording of his 2002 album God's Son by his A&R Lenny "Linen" Nicholson; Nas recorded vocals over the instrumental (along with his cousin and Bravehearts member Nashawn), but also never finished the song as according to Nicholson it "was a track that he just fell out of love with".

50 Cent first became aware of the instrumental after fellow rapper and Diplomats associate Cam'ron introduced him to Digga; after hearing the instrumental at a Nas recording session, he liked it and asked Nicholson to send him a copy to record to. With Nas' permission, Nicholson agreed, since he knew that "50 was looking for something just to stay busy and to keep writing". Once 50 Cent had finished his recording in Sha Money XL's basement studio, Sha Money XL travelled to Detroit and gave the recording to Eminem, where the pair "spent about a week or two" mixing the track and adding additional sound effects; co-producer Luis Resto also provided a guitar section. Sha Money XL finally played the completed song to Digga via telephone, and after hearing it again in his lawyer's office Digga was satisfied that it sounded "exactly what I wanted it to be, as far as having that gritty, dirty type feeling".

== Music video ==
The video was directed by Jessy Terrero and produced by Jill Hardin and Darrell "Digga" Branch. The song's music video is about 50 Cent's shooting from May 24, 2000, when he was shot nine times in Queens, New York. Mekhi Phifer appears in the video as 50's hitman. Adam Rodriguez and Rory Cochrane, both stars of CSI: Miami at the time of production, appear as detectives. Gabriel Casseus appears as a person who is allied with the person that shoots 50 Cent. Tommy Lister appears as one of 50 Cent's associates. G-Unit members Lloyd Banks and Young Buck make cameo appearances.

== Commercial performance ==
The song peaked at number 11 on the US Bubbling Under R&B/Hip-Hop Singles in 2003. On June 14, 2006, "Many Men" was certified Gold by the Recording Industry Association of America (RIAA), for selling 500,000 copies in the United States of America. On January 19, 2023, it was certified three times platinum by the RIAA, indicating 3 million copies sold. While the song was a commercial success, 50 Cent commented in an interview years later the song was his least favorite in Get Rich or Die Tryin', largely in part to it being the slowest song of the album.

== Legacy ==
American rapper Pop Smoke interpolated the song on his 2020 track, "Got It on Me", and producer Metro Boomin sampled the song on his and 21 Savage's 2020 track "Many Men".

Vietnamese-American writer Ocean Vuong repeatedly references the song in his novel On Earth We're Briefly Gorgeous. As Vuong explained in an interview, "50 Cent's song was ubiquitous in the early aughts, where so much of this book takes place. It also marked the last era of gangsta rap, whose cultural framework provided men and boys a means of performing masculinity while also reducing it to erroneous tropes of misogyny and violence."

Following the 2024 attempted assassination of Donald Trump, the track resurged in popularity, placing in the top 10 on the US iTunes sales chart, and rising in sales by 250% on other streaming platforms. 50 Cent responded to the rise in popularity by posting on social media "Trump gets shot and now I'm trending 🤷🏽‍♂️", alongside an edited version of the album cover for Get Rich or Die Tryin' with Trump's face placed over his own. 50 Cent further performed "Many Men" with the edited cover photo the night of the attempted assassination during a concert in Boston. The edited album cover consequently made the song more popular, spreading on the internet through memes, including an AI cover of "Many Men" performed by Trump. However, Digga told TMZ that whilst happy about the song's renewed popularity, he did not want Trump using it on the campaign trail.

== Charts ==
Chart (2003)	Peak position
US Bubbling Under R&B/Hip-Hop Singles (Billboard)	11

== Certifications ==
Region	Certification	Certified units/sales
Brazil (Pro-Música Brasil)	Gold	30,000^{‡}
Denmark (IFPI Danmark)	Platinum	90,000^{‡}
Italy (FIMI)	Gold	50,000^{‡}
New Zealand (RMNZ)	4× Platinum	120,000^{‡}
United Kingdom (BPI)	2× Platinum	1,200,000^{‡}
United States (RIAA)	3× Platinum	3,000,000^{‡}
United States (RIAA) Mastertone	Gold	500,000^{*}
^{*} Sales figures based on certification alone.^{‡} Sales+streaming figures based on certification alone.
