= The Woo =

2020 single by Pop Smoke featuring 50 Cent and Roddy Ricch

Single by Pop Smoke featuring 50 Cent and Roddy Ricch

from the album Shoot for the Stars, Aim for the Moon
- Released: July 10, 2020
- Recorded: 2020
- Genre: Trap
- Length: 3:21
- Label: Victor Victor; Republic
- Songwriters: Bashar Jackson; Curtis Jackson III; Rodrick Moore, Jr.; Andre Loblack; Adam Hashim; Jess Jackson; Andrew Loffa; Ray Lennon; Karriem Mack; Billy Jones
- Producer: 808Melo

Pop Smoke singles chronology
"Make It Rain" (2020)	"The Woo" (2020)	"Mood Swings" (2020)

50 Cent singles chronology
"Big Rich Town" (2019)	"The Woo" (2020)	"Wish Me Luck" (2021)

Roddy Ricch singles chronology
"High Fashion" (2020)	"The Woo" (2020)	"Gifted" (2020)

Music video
- "The Woo" on YouTube

"The Woo" is a song by American rapper Pop Smoke featuring fellow American rappers 50 Cent and Roddy Ricch, from the former of the three's posthumous debut studio album, Shoot for the Stars, Aim for the Moon (2020) as well as the EP For The Night (2020). The song was released as the second single from the album on July 10, 2020, by Victor Victor Worldwide and Republic Records. It was written by the artists alongside producer 808Melo, co-producers Rxcksta and JW Lucas, and Jess Jackson, who is also credited as an additional producer alongside 1801 Records, Billy J, DJ Drewski, Jer-Z, K. Mack, and Ray Lennon.

"The Woo" is a Latin-influenced trap song that features flickers of Spanish acoustic guitar. Pop Smoke interpolates 50 Cent's single, "Candy Shop". The song received positive reviews from music critics, who praised 50 Cent's and Roddy Ricch's features. "The Woo" was featured in 2020 year-end lists by Vice and Complex. It was nominated for Song of Summer at the 2020 MTV Video Music Awards. The song reached number 11 on the US Billboard Hot 100 and was certified a double-platinum certification by the Recording Industry Association of America (RIAA). It reached the top-10 in the United Kingdom, Canada, New Zealand, and Portugal.

An accompanying music video was released on July 20, 2020, on what would have been Pop Smoke's twenty-first birthday. The music visual was directed by Eif Rivera, who had directed several videos for 50 Cent in the past. It features old archival footage edited on vintage TV screens of Pop Smoke performing various tasks while showing 50 Cent and Roddy Ricch being surrounded by expensive cars and women wearing bikinis. The video received positive reviews, with one critic saying it was sentimental.

== Background ==
"The Woo" was created the month Pop Smoke died. Pop Smoke asked 808Melo to play some of his beats, one of which Pop Smoke liked. The rapper said: "Oh, yeah, this is something different. This is what I want." Pop Smoke had not made a verse for the song but made a hook. He admitted to 808Melo he was struggling with writer's block. Steven Victor recalled he had never heard the song before. When he first started talking to 50 Cent about producing the album, Victor sent him a folder of all of Pop Smoke's songs. 50 Cent called Victor and was singing the hook of the song. Victor stated he did not even remember Pop Smoke doing it. Victor described it as a "most obscure joint". Victor commented that 50 Cent took over the song. 50 Cent explained that the song's chorus was written and that Victor had left it all the way open. There was no verse taken off of it, so the chorus played. 50 Cent said he then started the record. 50 Cent took to Instagram, reaching out to Roddy Ricch to help with the song, captioning a post of his: "Tell @roddyricch i'm looking for him, i need him on Pop album".

When 50 Cent invited Roddy Ricch to be on the album, he felt like he should have been a part of it general. 50 Cent recorded his verse while he was going through all Pop Smoke's records to find the right tone for the album. There were three records that he recorded, but he did not want to over-feature on the album, and just decided to be featured on "The Woo". Roddy Ricch had heard a couple of other songs from Pop Smoke but felt like "The Woo" was a good one because it was different from what Pop Smoke would usually record. He recorded his verse while he was in quarantine. He had a studio set up at the house and did it in one night. He called his engineer to cut it. The verse that Pop Smoke wrote for the song was in a different key. Producer Jess Jackson explained instead of not using the song at all, he talked to Mike Dean. Jackson was thinking of melodizing the vocals and tuning them, but could not do it because Pop Smoke would not have liked it. Dean said to Jackson: "Why don't you just do a chord change in the whole song?" Jackson sat down and did a key change for the song. 50 Cent and Roddy Ricch were in B minor, with the song switching up once Pop Smoke raps his verse in G minor. Jackson made the song together from two demos in different keys.

== Writing and composition ==
It was written by Pop Smoke, known as Bashar Jackson, alongside 50 Cent, Roddy Ricch, 808Melo, Rxcksta, and JW Lucas, who have the respective real names of Curtis Jackson, Rodrick Moore, Andre Loblack, Adam Hashim, and John Lucas. Jess Jackson was also credited as a writer. The song was produced by 808Melo while co-produced by Rxcksta and JW Lucas. 1801 Records, Billy J, DJ Drewski, Jer-Z, Jess Jackson, K. Mack, and Ray Lennon were credited as additional producers. Musically, "The Woo" is a Latin-influenced trap song. A.D. Amorosi of Variety said the track is "filled with flickers of Spanish acoustic guitar, and [Pop] Smoke making high and nice with his buds". Danny Schwartz of Rolling Stone commented that the track features "arpeggiated guitar lines". Gary Suarez of Entertainment Weekly stated Pop Smoke "emulates the Queens rapper's cadence and tone". David Arron Blake of HipHopDX commented that Pop Smoke, 50 Cent, and Roddy Ricch "trade bars atop 808Melo's groovy production". In his verse, Pop Smoke interpolates 50 Cent's 2005 hit single, "Candy Shop", rapping: "Let me take you to the Candy Shop, show you all I got/I put diamonds on your chain to match your diamond ring."

== Reception ==
Vulture's Craig Jenkins complimented Pop Smoke's versatility, stating that the song "would've silenced anyone who tried to accuse Pop of being a one-dimensional artist". Uproxx's Wongo Okon labeled it a "well-meshed collaboration of the past and the present". NME's Dhruva Balram opined that it features a "memorable verse from 50 Cent". Roisin O'Connor of The Independent wrote that "West Coast Shit" feels "paper-thin" when following "The Woo". Briana Younger of NPR said Pop "sounds scarily like 50 Cent" on the song. Arron Blake said the song has "the most radio replay value" from Shoot for the Stars, Aim for the Moon. Jade Gomez from Paste stated the song has "50 Cent's satisfying feature accented with Roddy Rich's vocals". M.T. Richards, for Consequence of Sound said 50 Cent "demolishes" the song, saying he would "never tire of 50 [Cent], a cutely insolent schoolyard bully". August Brown of the Los Angeles Times wrote the song has "mournful singing".

Ashton Howard of Earmilk said the song is a "complete swing and a miss". David Crone of AllMusic stated Pop Smoke isn't "even given the dignity of a first verse, with featured artists muscling their way in ahead of the late rapper on tracks like 'The Woo' and 'Diana'". Vice ranked "The Woo" at number 45 on their list of 2020's best songs. Kristin Corry remarked that the song is "an alternate universe of what the Brooklyn rapper could have become—a bridge between the rap of yesterday and the sound of tomorrow". The song placed at number 26 on Complex's the Best Songs of 2020 list, with Eric Skelton calling it the catchiest song on the album, and stating it is "a bittersweet moment that hinted at the fact [Pop Smoke] was about to catapult to global superstardom". He concluded by saying "The Woo" is an "undeniable hit, and a lasting reminder of Pop [Smoke's] limitless abilities". It was nominated for Song of Summer at the 2020 MTV Video Music Awards.

== Release and commercial performance ==
"The Woo" was released on Pop Smoke's posthumous debut studio album Shoot for the Stars, Aim for the Moon, as the tenth track on July 3, 2020. The song was later released as the album's second single on July 10, 2020. Following the release of Shoot for the Stars, Aim for the Moon, "The Woo" debuted and peaked at number 11 on the US Billboard Hot 100. The song also peaked at number three on the US Rhythmic chart and number nine on the Hot R&B/Hip-Hop Songs chart. The Recording Industry Association of America (RIAA) certified the single a double platinum certification, which denotes two million units based on sales and track-equivalent on-demand streams. The song peaked at number 9 on the UK Singles Chart, giving Pop Smoke his first top-10 hit in the United Kingdom. The song was later certified platinum by the British Phonographic Industry (BPI), denoting track-equivalent sales and streams of 600,000 units in the UK. It further reached the top-10 in Canada, New Zealand, and Portugal. It reached the top-20 in Australia, Denmark, Ireland, and Switzerland.

== Music video ==
=== Background ===
The video features old archival footage edited on vintage TV screens of Pop Smoke performing several activities.

50 Cent teased clips of the song's music video on his Instagram account on July 17, 2020. His post was captioned "You know da Vibes, Monday is Pops birthday so Video Monday." The music video was later uploaded to Pop Smoke's YouTube channel on July 19, 2020, along with the release of the deluxe edition of Shoot for the Stars, Aim for the Moon. The music video was then uploaded to 50 Cent's YouTube channel a day later. The visual was released that day to honor what would have Pop Smoke's twenty-first birthday. The music video was directed by Eif Rivera, who had directed a number of videos for 50 Cent in the past. Rivera took inspiration for creating the visual by the parking lot scene from the music video from Dr. Dre, Snoop Dogg, and Akon's hit single "Kush" (2010).

=== Synopsis and reception ===
The video features old archival footage edited on vintage TV screens of Pop Smoke inside of a tour bus, making music in a studio, performing on stage, and dancing on top of a car. The visuals also feature 50 Cent and Roddy Ricch singing the song while being surrounded by expensive cars and women wearing bikinis. The video also shows women kissing and hugging each other.

The music video was met with positive reviews from critics. The staff of Rap-Up described the music video as a "steamy clip". Marisa Mendez of HipHopDX stated that the visual "provides an authentic feel despite the absence of its key player". Writing for HotNewHipHop, Alex Zidel commented it was "nice to see some throwback footage of Pop having fun in the studio added into the video," but opined that the "moment is certainly sentimental for fans of the late Brooklyn rapper".

The music video on YouTube has received over 205 million views as of April 2024.

== Credits and personnel ==
Credits adapted from Tidal.

- Pop Smoke – vocals, songwriter
- 50 Cent – vocals, songwriter
- Roddy Ricch – vocals, songwriter
- 808Melo – production, programming songwriter
- Jess Jackson – mastering engineer, mixing engineer, additional production, songwriter
- Rxcksta – co-production, songwriter
- Jw Lucas – co-production, songwriter
- 1801 Records – additional production
- Billy J – additional production
- DJ Drewski – additional production
- Jer-Z – additional production
- K. Mach – additional production
- Ray Lennon – additional production
- Cheese – engineer
- Ky Miller – engineer
- Chris Dennis – recording engineer
- Derek Ali – vocal mixing
- Rose Adams – assistant mixing engineer
- Sage Skofield – assistant mixing engineer
- Sean Solymar – assistant mixing engineer

== Charts ==
=== Weekly charts ===
Weekly chart performance for "The Woo"
Chart (2020)	Peak position
Australia (ARIA)	18
Austria (Ö3 Austria Top 40)	42
Belgium (Ultratop 50 Flanders)	32
Belgium (Ultratip Bubbling Under Wallonia)	15
Canada Hot 100 (Billboard)	6
Denmark (Tracklisten)	17
Germany (GfK)	86
Iceland (Tónlistinn)	15
Ireland (IRMA)	13
Netherlands (Single Top 100)	44
New Zealand (Recorded Music NZ)	10
Norway (VG-lista)	31
Portugal (AFP)	6
Sweden (Sverigetopplistan)	23
Switzerland (Schweizer Hitparade)	14
UK Singles (Official Charts)	9
US Billboard Hot 100	11
US Hot R&B/Hip-Hop Songs (Billboard)	9
US Rhythmic Airplay (Billboard)	3
US Rolling Stone Top 100	4

=== Year-end charts ===
2020 year-end chart positions for "The Woo"
Chart (2020)	Position
Canada (Canadian Hot 100)	78
US Billboard Hot 100	78
US Hot R&B/Hip-Hop Songs (Billboard)	37
US Rhythmic (Billboard)	24

== Certifications ==
Certifications and sales for "The Woo"
Region	Certification	Certified units/sales
Australia (ARIA)	Platinum	70,000^{‡}
Brazil (Pro-Música Brasil)	Platinum	40,000^{‡}
Denmark (IFPI Danmark)	Platinum	90,000^{‡}
France (SNEP)	Platinum	200,000^{‡}
Italy (FIMI)	Gold	35,000^{‡}
New Zealand (RMNZ)	2× Platinum	60,000^{‡}
Portugal (AFP)	2× Platinum	20,000^{‡}
United Kingdom (BPI)	Platinum	600,000^{‡}
United States (RIAA)	2× Platinum	2,000,000^{‡}
Streaming
Greece (IFPI Greece)	Gold	1,000,000^{†}
Sweden (GLF)	Gold	4,000,000^{†}
^{‡} Sales+streaming figures based on certification alone.^{†} Streaming-only figures based on certification alone.
