= What You Know Bout Love =

2020 single by Pop Smoke

Single by Pop Smoke

from the album Shoot for the Stars, Aim for the Moon
- Released: October 9, 2020
- Recorded: 2020
- Genre: R&B
- Length: 2:40
- Label: Victor Victor; Republic
- Songwriters: Bashar Jackson; Tashim Zene; Elgin Lumpkin; Troy Oliver
- Producer: IAmTash

Pop Smoke singles chronology
"For the Night" (2020)	"What You Know Bout Love" (2020)	"Black Mask" / "Double G" (2020)

Music video
- "What You Know Bout Love" on YouTube

"What You Know Bout Love" is a song by American rapper and singer Pop Smoke from his posthumous debut studio album, Shoot for the Stars, Aim for the Moon (2020) as well as the EP Mood Swings (2020). The song was written by Pop Smoke, alongside producer IAmTash, with additional writing credits going to Ginuwine and Troy Oliver for the interpolation and sampling of Ginuwine's "Differences". The song was released as the fifth single from the album on October 9, 2020, by Victor Victor Worldwide and Republic Records. An R&B track, it lyrically showcases Pop Smoke singing about his passion for his lover. The song received generally positive reviews from music critics, with a number of them praising the lyrics and the rapper's range.

It peaked at number nine on the US Billboard Hot 100 and number four on the UK Singles Chart, becoming Pop Smoke's second top-10 single in the United States, and third in the United Kingdom. Internationally, the song peaked within the top five of four other countries, including Norway, where it reached number three. The song has received several certifications, including being certified triple platinum in Canada by Music Canada (MC). The accompanying music video was directed by Oliver Cannon and uploaded to Pop Smoke's YouTube channel on December 22, 2020. It features never before seen clips of the rapper and his fans performing the song's dance challenge on TikTok. The video received positive reviews, with critics describing it as bittersweet.

== Background and composition ==
"What You Know Bout Love" was one of the earlier songs Pop Smoke had when Steven Victor first signed him. Victor recalled how excited he was about the song because he always liked the original sample, which Pop Smoke found on his own on YouTube. Victor said "What You Know Bout Love" was one of the tracks that they thought was too big to release right away. He and his team always wanted the song on the album because they thought it was at that level. Victor commented that when Pop Smoke talked about the song, he stated, "Yo, this is for when I'm in my love bag”. IAmTash explained he posted the beat for "What You Know Bout Love" in 2019. He stated that he put it up as a Playboi Carti-type beat. IAmTash announced it was just for marketing, but in October 2019, he saw a snippet of Pop Smoke dancing to it. He admitted to not having known where Pop Smoke got the beat from because he had never spoken to him. IAmTash hypothesized that Pop Smoke got it from YouTube.

The song was written by Pop Smoke, alongside IAmTash, Elgin Lumpkin, and Troy Oliver. IAmTash solely handled the song's production. Mastering and mixing were both handled by Jess Jackson, while Rose Adams, Sage Skofield, and Sean Solymar served as assistant engineers. Zene, Corey Nutile, and Dom Martin handled the song's programming, while Pierre Rogue was credited as assistant programming engineer. "What You Know Bout Love" was released on Pop Smoke's posthumous debut studio album Shoot for the Stars, Aim for the Moon, as the fifteenth track on July 3, 2020.

Music journalists described "What You Know Bout Love" as an R&B track. The song prominently samples the instrumental of Ginuwine's 2001 hit, "Differences", standing as one of several tracks from Shoot for the Stars, Aim for the Moon to sample early 2000s songs. Lyrically, it finds Pop Smoke detailing his infatuation with his lover, and eager to please her. Jade Gomez of Paste opined that the song is a sensual, "sentimental reflection on love", and that Pop Smoke "ponders the beauty of his girlfriend going for a jog and making him breakfast." In a retrospective commentary, the staff of Dazed wrote that Pop Smoke "delivers a sensitive confession of catching feelings despite yourself. 'Look, baby, I said I ain't gon' front.'" They continued, saying the rapper "trip[s] slightly over the words, 'You got my heart beating so fast to words I can't pronounce'." The staff stated that "What You Know Bout Love" speaks "straight to a generation raised on 90s R&B expectations of romance, searching for connection in a time when sending nudes is considered a love language."

== Reception ==
"What You Know Bout Love" was met with generally positive reviews from music critics, with a number of them praising the lyrics. NME's Dhruva Balram opined the song shows Pop Smoke "had ambitions to break into multiple genres." Julyssa Lopez of The New Yorker reacted favorably to Pop Smoke's versatility, writing: "Softened performances on 'What You Know Bout Love' and 'Something Special' illuminate newly poppy pop sides of the artist, yet, even in those quieter glimpses, his presence looms large—an enduring force, too big to contain." August Brown of the Los Angeles Times said the song showcases Pop Smoke's range, along with fellow album tracks "Yea Yea" and "Diana", which "have new open space and melody, with lyrics that are even sometimes tender." In her album review, Hannah Giorgis of The Atlantic said, "of the slow jams that sample earlier hits, 'What You Know Bout Love' is the clear highlight. Pop Smoke sings the chorus with an arresting warmth and opens the second verse with a rare admission of weakness."

Bianca Gracie of Paper magazine stated that "'What You Know Bout Love' gives Ginuwine's 2001 'Differences' smash an added dose of nostalgia." Writing for Uproxx, Wongo Okon described the song as an "R&B sample trifecta." In a less enthusiastic review, Slant Magazine's Charles Lyons-Burt opined that the song strays from Pop Smoke's "patented drill and trap origins", and said it is "dreary and tepid rather than [an] exciting sonic departure." The staff of Dazed placed "What You Know Bout Love" at number 14 on their The 20 Best Tracks of 2020 list, calling it a "genre-mixing crossover that deserved to make [Pop Smoke] a star" as well as "an endearing chink in the armor of his initial cockiness." On social media platform TikTok, "What You Know Bout Love" was one of the top 10 songs of 2020 on the app, with over 12.1 million videos.

== Accolades ==
Awards and nominations for "What You Know Bout Love"
Year	Organization	Award	Result	Ref(s)
2021	American Music Awards	Favorite Rap/Hip Hop Song	Nominated	

== Commercial performance ==
Following the release of Shoot for the Stars, Aim for the Moon, "What You Know Bout Love" debuted at number 52 on the US Billboard Hot 100. The song later reached number nine on the chart, giving Pop Smoke his second top-10 hit in the United States. "What You Know Bout Love" also peaked at number 11 on the US Billboard Global 200. It further peaked at number four on the US Hot R&B/Hip-Hop Songs and number eight on the US Mainstream Top 40. The song peaked at number one on the Rhythmic chart, giving the late rapper his second number one on the chart. With this feat, Pop Smoke became the first artist rapper to have back-to-back number ones on the Rhythmic chart since Canadian rapper Drake.

On the UK Singles Chart, the song entered at number 27 for the issue dated September 25, 2020. The following week, it rose 13 places to number 14. The song climbed to number nine for the issue dated October 9, 2020, giving Pop Smoke his third top 10 hit in the United Kingdom. "What You Know Bout Love" later rose to number four for the issue dated October 23, 2020. "What You Know Bout Love" peaked at number 16 on the Canadian Hot 100. It was certified triple platinum by Music Canada (MC), denoting track-equivalent sales and streams of 160,000 units in Canada. In New Zealand, "What You Know Bout Love" peaked at number six and received a platinum certification from Recorded Music NZ (RMNZ) for shipments of over 30,000 copies. It reached the top five in Australia, Ireland, Norway, and Portugal. Furthermore, the song has reached the top 10 in Austria, Switzerland, and the Czech Republic.

== Music video ==
=== Background and synopsis ===
The music video for "What You Know Bout Love" was directed by Oliver Cannon. It was uploaded to Pop Smoke's YouTube channel on December 22, 2020. The visual opens with a video of Pop Smoke thanking his fans and telling them how much he appreciates and loves them: "I love y'all, I fuck with y'all, and I appreciate y'all. I wouldn't be nothing without y'all." The video includes never before seen clips of Pop Smoke working in the studio, traveling around the world, spending time with his family and friends, posting videos on his TikTok account, and performing live. The music video also features fans performing the song's dance challenge on TikTok. The visual ends with Pop Smoke riding on an airplane and saying: "I don't know who needs to hear this bro, but don't let nobody ever tell you you can't do nothing. Whatever you wanna do, just fucking do it. Don't look back."

=== Critical reception ===
The music video was met with positive reviews from critics. Writing for Revolt, Jon Powell described the video as "bittersweet". Royal Bey of Hypebeast stated that Pop Smoke's "energy is still felt in the official video." Mitch Findlay of HotNewHipHop commented that the visual "provides a welcome glimpse into Pop Smoke's behind-the-scenes process", but said it "drive[s] home a bittersweet reminder in the process." He continued, admitting that "difficult though it may be to watch Pop Smoke's new video, it's still a welcome reminder of the man behind the music, and a good excuse to go back and revisit Shoot For The Stars."

== Credits and personnel ==
Credits adapted from Tidal.

- Bashar Jackson – vocals, writer
- IAmTash – production, writer, associated performer, programming
- Elgin Lumpkin – writer
- Troy Oliver – writer
- Jess Jackson – mastering engineer, mix engineer
- Rose Adams – assistant engineer
- Sage Skofield – assistant engineer
- Sean Solymar – assistant engineer
- Corey Nutile – programming engineer
- Dom Martin – programming engineer
- Pierre Rogue – assistant programming engineer

== Charts ==
=== Weekly charts ===
Weekly chart performance for "What You Know Bout Love"
Chart (2020–2021)	Peak position
Australia (ARIA)	5
Austria (Ö3 Austria Top 40)	9
Belgium (Ultratop 50 Flanders)	26
Belgium (Ultratop 50 Wallonia)	38
Canada Hot 100 (Billboard)	16
Czech Republic Singles Digital (ČNS IFPI)	10
Denmark (Tracklisten)	12
Finland (Suomen virallinen lista)	14
France (SNEP)	28
Germany (GfK)	12
Global 200 (Billboard)	11
Greece International (IFPI)	5
Hungary (Stream Top 40)	17
Iceland (Tónlistinn)	18
Ireland (IRMA)	5
Italy (FIMI)	28
Netherlands (Single Top 100)	12
New Zealand (Recorded Music NZ)	6
Norway (VG-lista)	3
Portugal (AFP)	5
Romania (Airplay 100)	84
Singapore (RIAS)	24
Slovakia Singles Digital (ČNS IFPI)	24
Spain (Promusicae)	92
Sweden (Sverigetopplistan)	6
Switzerland (Schweizer Hitparade)	8
UK Singles (Official Charts)	4
US Billboard Hot 100	9
US Adult Pop Airplay (Billboard)	38
US Dance Airplay (Billboard)	23
US Hot R&B/Hip-Hop Songs (Billboard)	4
US Pop Airplay (Billboard)	8
US Rhythmic Airplay (Billboard)	1

=== Year-end charts ===
2020 year-end chart positions for "What You Know Bout Love"
Chart (2020)	Position
Hungary (Stream Top 40)	73
Sweden (Sverigetopplistan)	97
UK Singles (OCC)	90
US Hot R&B/Hip-Hop Songs (Billboard)	74

2021 year-end chart positions for "What You Know Bout Love"
Chart (2021)	Position
Australia (ARIA)	61
Canada (Canadian Hot 100)	62
France (SNEP)	129
Global 200 (Billboard)	51
Portugal (AFP)	100
US Billboard Hot 100	22
US Hot R&B/Hip-Hop Songs (Billboard)	11
US Mainstream Top 40 (Billboard)	27
US Rhythmic (Billboard)	1

== Certifications ==
Certifications and sales for "What You Know Bout Love"
Region	Certification	Certified units/sales
Australia (ARIA)	2× Platinum	140,000^{‡}
Austria (IFPI Austria)	Gold	15,000^{‡}
Belgium (BRMA)	Gold	20,000^{‡}
Brazil (Pro-Música Brasil)	3× Platinum	120,000^{‡}
Canada (Music Canada)	3× Platinum	240,000^{‡}
Denmark (IFPI Danmark)	Platinum	90,000^{‡}
France (SNEP)	Diamond	333,333^{‡}
Germany (BVMI)	Gold	200,000^{‡}
Italy (FIMI)	Platinum	70,000^{‡}
New Zealand (RMNZ)	Platinum	30,000^{‡}
Poland (ZPAV)	Platinum	50,000^{‡}
Portugal (AFP)	2× Platinum	20,000^{‡}
Spain (Promusicae)	Gold	30,000^{‡}
United Kingdom (BPI)	2× Platinum	1,200,000^{‡}
United States (RIAA)	2× Platinum	2,000,000^{‡}
Streaming
Greece (IFPI Greece)	Gold	1,000,000^{†}
Sweden (GLF)	Platinum	8,000,000^{†}
^{‡} Sales+streaming figures based on certification alone.^{†} Streaming-only figures based on certification alone.
