= Got It on Me =

2020 song by Pop Smoke

Song by Pop Smoke

from the album Shoot for the Stars, Aim for the Moon
- Released: July 3, 2020
- Genre: Hip hop
- Length: 2:43
- Label: Victor Victor; Republic
- Songwriters: Bashar Jackson; Curtis Jackson; Darrell Branch; Dmytro Luchko; Frederick Perren; Keni St. Lewis; Luis Resto
- Producer: Young Devante

Music video
- "Got It on Me" on YouTube

"Got It on Me" is a song by American rapper Pop Smoke from his posthumous debut studio album, Shoot for the Stars, Aim for the Moon (2020) as well as the EP For The Night (2020). The song was written by Pop Smoke, born Bashar Jackson, alongside 50 Cent who has the real name of Curtis Jackson, Darrell Branch, Dmytro Luchko, Frederick Perren, Keni St. Lewis, and Luis Resto, while Young Devante solely handled the production. It is a hip hop track that interpolates the lyrics of 50 Cent's "Many Men (Wish Death)".

In the lyrics, Pop Smoke pleads for mercy from his enemies. "Got It on Me" received generally positive reviews from music critics, with several of them praising its usage of "Many Men (Wish Death)". The song peaked at number 31 on the US Billboard Hot 100 and number 107 on the Billboard Global 200. An accompanying music video was released on July 3, 2020, and features never before seen clips of Pop Smoke.

== Background and release ==
"Got It on Me" was one of the earlier songs Pop Smoke had when Steven Victor first signed him. Victor described the song as "incredible" and put it aside for the album. Pop Smoke's friend Rah Swish explained that the song was one of five to ten songs Pop Smoke ever recorded. He told Swish that "Got It on Me" was going to be a "hit record", and that it would take him "over the top". Swish disagreed, saying Pop Smoke was just coming out and that the track was "too strong". The song's producer, Young Devante, said he had made the track's beat in August 2018. He was informed by one of his subscribers that Pop Smoke had found it on his YouTube channel. Young Devante described the song's beat as a "Meek Mill-type beat", and wanted to work with Pop Smoke in the future. "Got It on Me" prominently interpolates the lyrics of 50 Cent's 2003 single, "Many Men (Wish Death)", standing as one of several tracks from Shoot for the Stars, Aim for the Moon to sample early 2000s songs. 50 Cent said he was shocked when he heard Pop Smoke's sample of the recording. Jess Jackson commented that Pop Smoke had a "husky, bass-driven, scooped-out rap", and stated the rapper sounded like 50 Cent when singing the song. Benjamin Lust, Artists and repertoire of Republic Records, admitted at first they did not have Pop Smoke's vocal files, while saying the song would have sounded "bizarre" without them, so he had to track them down. They were able to find his vocal files and Lust concluded that the song sounded much better with them.

The song was written by Pop Smoke, known as Bashar Jackson, alongside 50 Cent, Darrell Branch, Dmytro Luchko, Frederick Perren, Keni St. Lewis, and Luis Resto. Mastering and mixing were both handled by Jess Jackson, while Rose Adams, Sage Skofield, and Sean Solymar were credited as assistant engineers and assistant mixers. Dom Martin, Ky Miller, and Yung Ave received credit as the recording engineers, while Pierre Rogue was credited as an assistant recording engineer. On July 3, 2020, "Got It on Me" was released as the 17th track on Pop Smoke's debut posthumous studio album Shoot for the Stars, Aim for the Moon.

== Music and lyrics ==
Wongo Okon of Uproxx described "Got It on Me" as a hip hop track. Mitch Findlay of HotNewHipHop stated that Young Devante opts for a "dark vibe" with the song, as well as saying it is complete with "eerie choir chants and gothic church bells." He continued, writing that the "aura of death surrounds it, and Pop Smoke's baritone belts out Fif's iconic chorus with purpose." NME's Dhruva Balram commented that "Got It on Me" rounds off "expertly with the triple-threat" and sees Pop Smoke "looking towards a future he never had."

Bianca Gracie of Paper magazine stated that Pop Smoke "pleads for mercy and taunts his enemies in the same breath" on the song. Danny Schwartz of Rolling Stone mentioned that in the song's final 30 seconds, the beat drops out, and Pop Smoke's "bluesman's bare voice" revisits the hook from "Many Men (Wish Death)": "Many, many, many, many men/Wish death 'pon me." According to A.D. Amorosi of Variety, Pop Smoke "prays for those who are out for his blood": "Is you ridin' or you hidin'?/ If you slidin' then you owe me."

== Reception and promotion ==
"Got It on Me" was met with generally positive reviews from music critics. Rolling Stone's Danny Schwartz said listening to Pop Smoke's vocals in the last 30 seconds of the song "feels like walking on hallowed ground." Variety's A.D. Amorosi described "Got It on Me" as "grand", and that "its soulful chorus – like so many of Smoke's centerpieces – offers a sense of uplift, even when his back is against the wall." David Arron Blake of HipHopDX defined the song as "chilling". David Crone of AllMusic said while the song was far from a new joint, it felt "immensely satisfying" to hear to hear "Many Men (Wish Death)" on the track. In a less enthusiastic review, Slant Magazine's Charles Lyons-Burt opined that the song finds Pop Smoke "doggedly racing against [its] beat, and there are brief instances where the rapper's glib sense of humor and confidence invest lines like 'I need your number and that's that' and 'I ain't with the talk or the chit chat' with a hoarse individuality."

Following the release of Shoot for the Stars, Aim for the Moon, "Got It on Me" debuted and peaked at number 31 on the US Billboard Hot 100. The song has also peaked at number 107 on the Billboard Global 200 and number 15 on the US Hot R&B/Hip-Hop Songs charts. It further peaked at number 14 on the Canadian Hot 100, number 40 in Sweden, number 59 in Australia, and number 82 in France.

A music video for "Got It on Me" was released to Pop Smoke's YouTube channel on July 3, 2020. The visual is shot in black and white and features never before seen footage of Pop Smoke working in the recording studio, walking through streets with his fans and team, and performing live. Writing for Hypebeast, Felson Sajonas stated that the video "echoes Pop Smoke's often cheerful demeanor and party persona."

== Credits and personnel ==
Credits adapted from Tidal.

- Pop Smoke – vocals, writer
- 50 Cent – writer
- Darrell Branch – writer
- Young Devante – writer, programming, producer
- Frederick Perren – writer
- Keni St.Lewis – writer
- Luis Resto – writer
- Jess Jackson – mastering engineer, mix engineer
- Rose Adams – assistant engineer, assistant mixer
- Sage Skofield – assistant engineer, assistant mixer
- Sean Solymar – assistant engineer, assistant mixer
- Dom Martin – recording engineer
- Ky Miller – recording engineer
- Yung Ave – recording engineer
- Pierre Rogue – assistant recording engineer

== Charts ==
=== Weekly charts ===
Weekly chart performance for "Got It on Me"
| Chart (2020) | Peak position |
|---|---|
| Australia (ARIA) | 59 |
| Canada Hot 100 (Billboard) | 14 |
| Denmark (Tracklisten) | 33 |
| France (SNEP) | 82 |
| Global 200 (Billboard) | 107 |
| Iceland (Tónlistinn) | 16 |
| Netherlands (Single Top 100) | 48 |
| Portugal (AFP) | 86 |
| Sweden (Sverigetopplistan) | 40 |
| Switzerland (Schweizer Hitparade) | 52 |
| US Billboard Hot 100 | 31 |
| US Hot R&B/Hip-Hop Songs (Billboard) | 15 |

=== Year-end charts ===
Year-end chart performance for "Got It on Me"
| Chart (2020) | Position |
|---|---|
| US Hot R&B/Hip-Hop Songs (Billboard) | 80 |

== Certifications ==
Certifications and sales for "Got It on Me"
| Region | Certification | Certified units/sales |
|---|---|---|
| Australia (ARIA) | Gold | 35,000^{‡} |
| Brazil (Pro-Música Brasil) | Gold | 20,000^{‡} |
| Denmark (IFPI Danmark) | Platinum | 90,000^{‡} |
| France (SNEP) | Gold | 100,000^{‡} |
| Italy (FIMI) | Gold | 50,000^{‡} |
| Poland (ZPAV) | Gold | 25,000^{‡} |
| Portugal (AFP) | Gold | 5,000^{‡} |
| United Kingdom (BPI) | Gold | 400,000^{‡} |
| United States (RIAA) | Platinum | 1,000,000^{‡} |
Streaming
| Greece (IFPI Greece) | Gold | 1,000,000^{†} |
| Sweden (GLF) | Gold | 4,000,000^{†} |
^{‡} Sales+streaming figures based on certification alone.^{†} Streaming-only figures based on certification alone.
