= Enjoy Yourself (Pop Smoke song) =

2020 song by Pop Smoke featuring Karol G

Promotional single by Pop Smoke featuring Karol G

from the album Shoot for the Stars, Aim for the Moon
- Released: July 2, 2020
- Recorded: February 2020, London
- Genre: Latin trap; urbano
- Length: 3:18
- Label: Victor Victor; Republic
- Songwriters: Bashar Jackson; Carolina Giraldo; Christoffer Marcussen; Lucas Grob; Pierre Meador; Karim Kharbouch; Richard Butler, Jr.
- Producers: Palaze; Luci G

"Enjoy Yourself" is a song by the American rapper Pop Smoke, featuring the Colombian singer Karol G, from the former's posthumous first studio album, Shoot for the Stars, Aim for the Moon (2020) as well as the EP of the same name (2020). The song was written by the performers with Rico Love, French Montana, Pierre Meador, Palaze and Luci G. It was released as a promotional single on July 2, 2020. A remix featuring the Nigerian singer Burna Boy in place of Karol G was included on the deluxe version of the album on July 20, 2020.

A Latin trap and urbano song with R&B influences, the song uses Spanish guitar and arpeggiated guitar lines. It contains a sample of "Drink Freely", a song by the Moroccan American rapper French Montana. The lyrics are a sentimental reflection of love. In reviews of Shoot for the Stars, Aim for the Moon, music critics lauded Pop Smoke and Karol G's vocals. In the United States, the song reached number 56 on the Billboard Hot 100 and number 32 on the Hot R&B/Hip-Hop Songs chart. It peaked at number 40 on the Canadian Hot 100.

== Background and recording ==
Pop Smoke recorded "Enjoy Yourself" in London in the week after his second mixtape, Meet the Woo 2 (2020), was released. He found the Danish producer Palaze's YouTube channel and used one of his beats for the song. Because he wanted the song to chart in international territories, Pop Smoke wanted the most famous Spanish female artist on it and persuaded the Colombian singer Karol G to participate. "Enjoy Yourself" was a concoction of another Pop Smoke song, "Get Right", one section of which ended up in "Enjoy Yourself".

On the release of Shoot for the Stars, Aim for the Moon, fans of Pop Smoke criticized Karol G's appearance on the song, as well as the fellow rapper Tyga's appearance on "West Coast Shit". Tyga shared screenshots of tweets on his Twitter account from February 2020, showing Pop Smoke asking him for a verse and asking for Karol G to be on the album as well. Fans were also not happy with Karol G replacing the Nigerian singer Burna Boy on "Enjoy Yourself". The album's executive producer, 50 Cent, defended Karol G, saying Burna Boy was removed from the song because he was still in a "growing stage", and would have made the song sound less good.

== Music and writing ==
Critics described "Enjoy Yourself" as an R&B-influenced Latin trap and urbano song. It features flickers of Spanish guitar and arpeggiated guitar lines. "Enjoy Yourself" contains a sample of "Drink Freely", a song by the Moroccan-American rapper French Montana. Bianca Gracie of Paper wrote that the song pays tribute to Pop Smoke's Panamanian heritage. Danny Schwartz of Rolling Stone observed that the song is about a gangster who occasionally suffers by love. In Paste, Jame Gomez thought that the song is a sensual, sentimental reflection on love. For the remix of "Enjoy Yourself", Burna Boy replaces Karol G and raps in the second verse. The song was written by Pop Smoke and Karol G, who are credited under their respective legal names of Bashar Jackson and Carolina Navarro. They co-wrote it with Rico Love, French Montana, Pierre Meador, Palaze and Luci G, with the latter two having the real names of Christoffer Marcussen and Lucas Grob, respectively.

== Release and reception ==
"Enjoy Yourself" was released as promotional single on July 2, 2020, from Pop Smoke's posthumous first studio album Shoot for the Stars, Aim for the Moon. A remix featuring Burna Boy was later released on the deluxe version of the album on July 20, 2020. An EP for "Enjoy Yourself" was released on September 30, 2020, with "Backseat", "Yea Yea", "She Feelin Nice" and "Tsunami".

A.D. Amorosi of Variety compared Pop Smoke's vocals on "Enjoy Yourself" to those of 50 Cent. Hannah Giorgis of The Atlantic described the song as a "sultry, dual-language song that feels tailor-made for the twilight zone of post-midnight dancing". Briana Younger of NPR defined the track as a "romance-centric" song. Writing for Vulture, Craig Jenkins said "Enjoy Yourself" should have been the "first of many urbano excursions for a rapper who was clearly interested". Gomez described Karol G's vocals as "silky smooth". Following the release of Shoot for the Stars, Aim for the Moon, "Enjoy Yourself" debuted and peaked at number 56 on the US Billboard Hot 100. The song simultaneously peaked at number 32 on the US Hot R&B/Hip-Hop Songs and number 40 on the Canadian Hot 100. It charted at number 95 in France.

== Track listing ==
- Enjoy Yourself - EP
1. "Enjoy Yourself" (featuring Karol G) - 3:18
2. "Backseat" (featuring PnB Rock) - 2:50
3. "Yea Yea" - 3:05
4. "She Feelin Nice" (featuring Jamie Foxx) - 2:35
5. "Tsunami" (featuring Davido) - 3:23

== Credits and personnel ==
Credits adapted from Tidal.

- Pop Smoke – vocals, songwriter
- Karol G – vocals, songwriter
- Luci G – production, programming, songwriter
- Palaze – production, programming, songwriter
- French Montana – songwriter
- Rico Love – songwriter
- Pierre Meador – songwriter
- Jess Jackson – mastering engineer, mixing engineer
- Rob Kinelski – mixing engineer, vocal engineer
- Corey Nutile – engineer
- Rose Adams – assistant engineer
- Sage Skofield – assistant engineer
- Sean Solymar – assistant engineer

== Charts ==
Chart performance for "Enjoy Yourself"
Chart (2020)	Peak position
Canada Hot 100 (Billboard)	40
France (SNEP)	95
US Billboard Hot 100	56
US Hot R&B/Hip-Hop Songs (Billboard)	32

== Certifications ==
Certifications and sales for "Enjoy Yourself"
Region	Certification	Certified units/sales
Australia (ARIA) Remix	Gold	35,000^{‡}
New Zealand (RMNZ)	Platinum	30,000^{‡}
Portugal (AFP)	Gold	5,000^{‡}
United Kingdom (BPI)	Silver	200,000^{‡}
^{‡} Sales+streaming figures based on certification alone.
