= Pop Smoke discography =

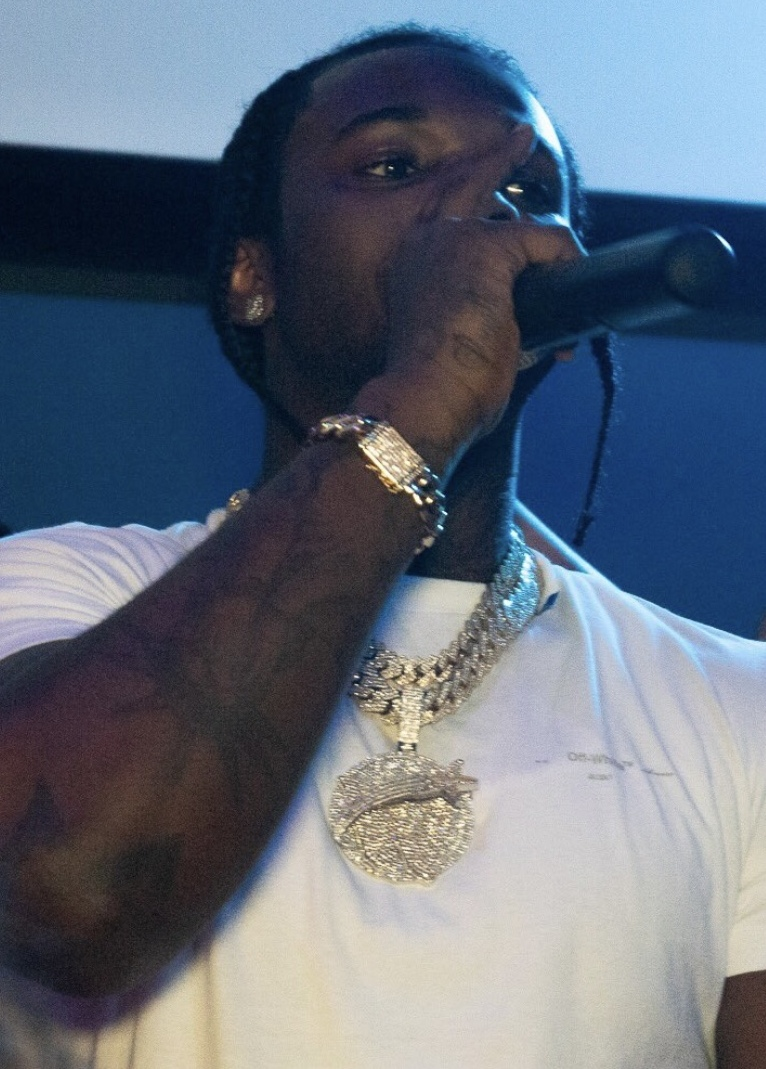
- Pop Smoke in 2020
- Studio albums: 2
- EPs: 3
- Singles: 28
- Music videos: 19
- Mixtapes: 2
- Promotional singles: 3

American drill rapper Pop Smoke released two studio albums, two mixtapes, three extended plays, nineteen music videos, twenty-eight singles (including six as a featured artist), and three promotional singles. Pop Smoke began his music career in 2018, when visiting a Brooklyn recording studio with fellow rapper Jay Gwuapo. After Gwuapo used drugs and fell asleep, Pop Smoke went into a booth to try rapping for the first time. He used a beat he got from English producer 808Melo and used American rapper Sheff G's song "Panic Part 3". He recorded his debut single titled "MPR (Panic Part 3 Remix)". Pop Smoke rose to fame with the release of his breakout single "Welcome to the Party" in April 2019. Two remixes of the song were later recorded, with one featuring Nicki Minaj and the other featuring Skepta.

In July 2019, Pop Smoke released his debut mixtape Meet the Woo, which included "Welcome to the Party". The rapper collaborated with JackBoys and Travis Scott on "Gatti", which debuted and peaked at number 69 on the US Billboard Hot 100, giving Pop Smoke his first Hot 100 hit. On February 7, 2020, Pop Smoke released his second mixtape Meet the Woo 2. The mixtape reached number seven on the US Billboard 200, giving him his first top ten hit in the United States. Less than two weeks after the release of Meet the Woo 2, Pop Smoke was murdered during a home invasion in Los Angeles. "Dior", the third single off Meet the Woo, became his first posthumous solo hit, peaking at number 22 on the Billboard Hot 100 and number 33 on the UK Singles Chart.

After Pop Smoke's death, 50 Cent announced he would executive produce his debut studio album. On July 3, 2020, Victor Victor Worldwide and Republic Records released Shoot for the Stars, Aim for the Moon. It debuted at number one on the Billboard 200 with first-week sales of 251,000 album-equivalent units, giving Pop Smoke his first number one hit in the US. It made Pop Smoke the first hip hop act to posthumously debut at number one on the Billboard 200 with a debut studio album. He joined The Notorious B.I.G., 2Pac, XXXTentacion, and Juice Wrld as the only hip hop acts to posthumously hit number one. Additionally, all 19 tracks on the album charted on the Billboard Hot 100 following its first week of release. The album spawned six singles, including two Billboard Hot 100 top ten hits: "For the Night" and "What You Know Bout Love". Pop Smoke's second studio album, Faith, his second posthumous project, was released on July 16, 2021. The album debuted at number one on the US Billboard 200 and gave the rapper his second US number-one hit. Pop Smoke became the first artist in history to have his first two albums posthumously debut at number one on the Billboard 200.

== Albums ==
=== Studio albums ===
List of studio albums, with selected chart positions and certifications
Title	Album details	Peak chart positions										Certifications
Title	Album details	US	AUS	CAN	DEN	FRA	IRE	NLD	NZ	SWE	UK	Certifications
Shoot for the Stars, Aim for the Moon	Released: July 3, 2020; Label: Victor Victor, Republic; Format: CD, LP, cassette, digital download, streaming	1	1	1	1	3	1	1	1	3	1	RIAA: 2× Platinum; ARIA: Platinum; BPI: 2× Platinum; GLF: Platinum; IFPI DEN: 5× Platinum; MC: 3× Platinum; RMNZ: 5× Platinum; SNEP: 3× Platinum
Faith	Released: July 16, 2021; Label: Victor Victor, Republic; Format: CD, LP, digital download, streaming	1	4	1	2	4	6	2	3	3	3	BPI: Silver; IFPI DEN: Gold; RMNZ: Gold; SNEP: Gold

== Extended plays ==
Title	EP details
Mood Swings	Released: September 23, 2020; Label: Victor Victor, Republic; Format: Streaming
Enjoy Yourself	Released: September 30, 2020; Label: Victor Victor, Republic; Format: Streaming
For the Night	Released: October 7, 2020; Label: Victor Victor, Republic; Format: Streaming

== Mixtapes ==
List of mixtapes, with selected chart positions and certifications
Title	Mixtape details	Peak chart positions										Certifications
Title	Mixtape details	US	AUS	CAN	DEN	FRA	IRE	NLD	NZ	SWE	UK	Certifications
Meet the Woo	Released: July 26, 2019; Label: Victor Victor, Republic; Format: CD, digital download, streaming	105	—	98	31	123	—	49	—	27	—	IFPI DEN: Platinum; BPI: Silver
Meet the Woo 2	Released: February 7, 2020; Label: Victor Victor, Republic; Format: CD, LP, digital download, streaming	7	24	8	18	51	29	14	27	19	16	RIAA: Gold; BPI: Gold; GLF: Gold; IFPI DEN: Platinum; MC: Gold; RMNZ: Platinum; SNEP: Gold
"—" denotes items which were not released in that country or failed to chart.

== Singles ==
=== As lead artist ===
List of singles as lead artist, with selected chart positions and certifications, showing year released and album name
Title	Year	Peak chart positions										Certifications	Album
Title	Year	US	US R&B /HH	AUS	CAN	FRA	IRE	NZ	SWE	SWI	UK	Certifications	Album
"Welcome to the Party" (Note: Only the solo version appears on Meet the Woo with the remixes featuring on the deluxe edition.) (solo or featuring Nicki Minaj or Skepta)	2019	— (Note: "Welcome to the Party" did not enter the Billboard Hot 100, but peaked at number five on the Bubbling Under Hot 100 chart.)	48	—	—	—	—	—	—	—	—	RIAA: Platinum; BPI: Gold; RMNZ: Platinum	Meet the Woo
"MPR"	2019	—	—	—	—	—	—	—	—	—	—		Non-album singles
"Flexin'"	2019	—	—	—	—	—	—	—	—	—	—		Non-album singles
"Meet the Woo"	2019	—	—	—	—	—	—	—	—	—	—		Meet the Woo
"War" (featuring Lil Tjay)	2019	—	—	—	100	—	—	—	—	—	—	BPI: Silver	Meet the Woo 2
"Fire in the Booth, Pt. 1" (Note: Appears on Meet the Woo 2 as "Armed N Dangerous (Charlie Sloth Freestyle)".) (with Charlie Sloth)	2019	—	—	—	—	—	—	—	—	—	—		Meet the Woo 2
"Drive the Boat"	2019	—	—	—	—	—	—	—	—	—	—		Non-album singles
"100k on a Coupe" (featuring Calboy)	2019	—	—	—	—	—	—	—	—	—	—		Non-album singles
"Christopher Walking"	2020	—	—	—	—	—	—	—	—	—	—		Meet the Woo 2
"Dior"	2020	22	12	48	28	48	26	38	53	42	33	RIAA: 3× Platinum; ARIA: Platinum; BPI: 2× Platinum; GLF: Platinum; RMNZ: 4× Platinum; SNEP: Diamond	Meet the Woo (Note: "Dior" also appears on Meet the Woo 2 (solo and remix with Gunna), Shoot for the Stars, Aim for the Moon and Faith (deluxe edition only) as a bonus track on each.)
"Shake the Room" (featuring Quavo)	2020	93	43	—	98	—	—	—	—	—	76	RIAA: Gold; BPI: Silver; RMNZ: Gold	Meet the Woo 2
"Make It Rain" (featuring Rowdy Rebel)	2020	49	21	73	35	99	86	— (Note: "Make It Rain" did not enter the NZ Top 40 Singles Chart, but peaked at number 11 on the NZ Hot Singles Chart.)	— (Note: "Make It Rain" did not enter the Swedish Singellista Chart, but peaked at number 12 on the Swedish Heatseeker Chart.)	84	73		Shoot for the Stars, Aim for the Moon
"The Woo" (featuring 50 Cent and Roddy Ricch) (Note: "The Woo" also appears on the EP For the Night.)	2020	11	9	18	6	39	13	10	23	14	9	RIAA: 2× Platinum; ARIA: Platinum; BPI: Platinum; GLF: Gold; RMNZ: 2× Platinum; SNEP: Platinum	Shoot for the Stars, Aim for the Moon
"Mood Swings" (featuring Lil Tjay) (Note: "Mood Swings" also appears on the EP Mood Swings as a remix featuring Summer Walker alongside Lil Tjay.)	2020	17	8	5	14	105	12	4	11	11	5	RIAA: 3× Platinum; ARIA: 2× Platinum; BPI: 2× Platinum; GLF: Platinum; MC: Gold; RMNZ: 3× Platinum; SNEP: Platinum	Shoot for the Stars, Aim for the Moon
"For the Night" (featuring Lil Baby and DaBaby) (Note: "For the Night" also appears on the EP For the Night.)	2020	6	4	13	7	38	14	9	17	7	14	RIAA: 8× Platinum; ARIA: 2× Platinum; BPI: Platinum; GLF: Platinum; RMNZ: 4× Platinum; SNEP: Diamond	Shoot for the Stars, Aim for the Moon
"What You Know Bout Love" (Note: "What You Know Bout Love" also appears on the EP Mood Swings.)	2020	9	4	5	16	28	5	6	6	8	4	RIAA: 2× Platinum; ARIA: 2× Platinum; BPI: 2× Platinum; GLF: Platinum; MC: 3× Platinum; RMNZ: 4× Platinum; SNEP: Diamond	Shoot for the Stars, Aim for the Moon
"Hello" (featuring A Boogie wit da Hoodie) (Note: "Hello" also appears on the EP For the Night.)	2021	83	32	—	31	—	—	— (Note: "Hello" did not enter the NZ Top 40 Singles Chart, but peaked at number 37 on the NZ Hot Singles Chart.)	— (Note: "Hello" did not enter the Swedish Singellista Chart, but peaked at number four on the Swedish Heatseeker Chart.)	53	—	RIAA: Platinum; ARIA: Gold; BPI: Gold; MC: 4× Platinum; RMNZ: 2× Platinum; SNEP: Platinum	Shoot for the Stars, Aim for the Moon
"AP"	2021	64	24	82	30	—	61	— (Note: "AP" did not enter the NZ Top 40 Singles Chart, but peaked at number four on the NZ Hot Singles Chart.)	—	41	56		Boogie: The Original Motion Picture Soundtrack
"Mr. Jones" (featuring Future)	2021	71	26	—	49	—	—	—	—	—	—		Faith
"Demeanor" (featuring Dua Lipa)	2021	86	35	43	26	131	20	— (Note: "Demeanor" did not enter the NZ Top 40 Singles Chart, but peaked at number two on the NZ Hot Singles Chart.)	41	63	14		Faith
"Woo Baby" (featuring Chris Brown)	2021	64	22	24	31	95	—	22	— (Note: "Woo Baby" did not enter the Swedish Singellista Chart, but peaked at number one on the Swedish Heatseeker Chart.)	41	54	BPI: Silver; RMNZ: Platinum	Faith
"Bad Boys" (featuring Obasi Jackson)	2021	—	—	—	—	—	—	—	—	—	—		Faith
"—" denotes a recording that did not chart or was not released in that territory.

=== As featured artist ===
List of singles as featured artist, with selected chart positions, showing year released and album name
Title	Year	Peak chart positions			Certifications	Album
Title	Year	US Bub.	US R&B /HH	NZ Hot	Certifications	Album
"50k" (Trap Manny featuring Pop Smoke)	2019	—	—	—		In Trap We Trust
"Mary Jane" (Guido Dos Santos featuring Pop Smoke and Lil Tjay)	2019	—	—	—		Non-album singles
"Slide (Remix)" (H.E.R. featuring Pop Smoke, A Boogie wit da Hoodie, and Chris Brown)	2020	—	—	32	BPI: Silver	Non-album singles
"Ordinary" (PnB Rock featuring Pop Smoke)	2020	—	—	—		Non-album singles
"Double G" (French Montana featuring Pop Smoke)	2020	13	—	—		CB5
"Black Mask" (Jay Gwuapo featuring Pop Smoke)	2020	—	—	—		Non-album singles
"Sunshine" (Tyga featuring Pop Smoke and Jhené Aiko)	2022	7	44	3	RIAA: Gold; RMNZ: Gold	Non-album singles
"—" denotes a recording that did not chart or was not released in that territory.

=== Promotional singles ===
List of singles as lead artist, with selected chart positions and certifications, showing year released and album name
Title	Year	Peak chart positions										Certifications	Album
Title	Year	US	US R&B /HH	AUS	CAN	FRA	IRE	NZ	SWE	SWI	UK	Certifications	Album
"Enjoy Yourself" (featuring Karol G or remix featuring Burna Boy) (Note: "Enjoy Yourself" (featuring Karol G) also appears on the EP Enjoy Yourself.)	2020	56	32	40	95	—	—	—	— (Note: "Enjoy Yourself" did not enter the Swedish Singellista Chart, but peaked at number 15 on the Swedish Heatseeker Chart.)	—	—	ARIA: Gold; BPI: Silver; RMNZ: Platinum	Shoot for the Stars, Aim for the Moon
"Iced Out Audemars (Remix)" (featuring Lil Wayne)	2020	—	—	—	—	—	—	—	—	—	—		Non-album single
"Lane Switcha" (with Skepta featuring ASAP Rocky, Juicy J and Project Pat)	2021	—	—	—	—	—	—	— (Note: "Lane Switcha" did not enter the NZ Top 40 Singles Chart, but peaked at number nine on the NZ Hot Singles Chart.)	—	—	—		F9: The Fast Saga (Original Motion Picture Soundtrack)
"—" denotes a recording that did not chart or was not released in that territory.

== Other charted and certified songs ==
List of charted songs, showing year released and album name
Title	Year	Peak chart positions										Certifications	Album
Title	Year	US	US R&B /HH	AUS	CAN	FRA	IRE	NZ	SWE	SWI	UK	Certifications	Album
"Gatti" (with JackBoys and Travis Scott)	2019	69	33	—	61	175	—	—	—	—	59	RIAA: 2× Platinum; BPI: Silver; RMNZ: Platinum; SNEP: Gold	JackBoys
"Element"	2020	—	—	—	90	—	—	—	— (Note: "Element" did not enter the Swedish Singellista Chart, but peaked at number 19 on the Swedish Heatseeker Chart.)	—	—	BPI: Silver; SNEP: Gold; RMNZ: Platinum	Meet the Woo 2
"Invincible"	2020	—	—	—	—	—	—	—	—	—	—	BPI: Silver; RMNZ: Platinum; SNEP: Platinum	Meet the Woo 2
"Get Back"	2020	—	—	—	—	—	—	—	—	—	—	BPI: Silver; RMNZ: Platinum; SNEP: Gold	Meet the Woo 2
"Like Me" (feat. PNB Rock)	2020	—	—	—	—	—	—	—	—	—	—	RMNZ: Gold	Meet the Woo 2
"Run It Up" (Nav featuring Pop Smoke)	2020	— (Note: "Run It Up" did not enter the Billboard Hot 100, but peaked at number 19 on the Bubbling Under Hot 100 chart.)	—	—	64	—	—	— (Note: "Run It Up" did not enter the NZ Top 40 Singles Chart, but peaked at number 29 on the NZ Hot Singles Chart.)	—	—	—		Good Intentions
"Zoo York" (Lil Tjay featuring Fivio Foreign and Pop Smoke)	2020	65	28	—	38	—	91	— (Note: "Zoo York" did not enter the NZ Top 40 Singles Chart, but peaked at number 16 on the NZ Hot Singles Chart.)	—	—	65	RIAA: Platinum; MC: Platinum	State of Emergency
"Bad Bitch from Tokyo" (Intro)	2020	55	31	—	49	97	—	—	—	—	—		Shoot for the Stars, Aim for the Moon
"Aim for the Moon" (featuring Quavo) (Note: "Aim for the Moon" also appears on the EP For the Night.)	2020	34	16	65	27	58	—	—	— (Note: "Aim for the Moon" did not enter the Swedish Singellista Chart, but peaked at number one on the Swedish Heatseeker Chart.)	—	—		Shoot for the Stars, Aim for the Moon
"44 Bulldog"	2020	39	20	72	26	65	—	—	— (Note: "44 Bulldog" did not enter the Swedish Singellista Chart, but peaked at number six on the Swedish Heatseeker Chart.)	—	—		Shoot for the Stars, Aim for the Moon
"Gangstas"	2020	37	18	66	16	54	—	—	79	28	—	BPI: Silver; SNEP: Gold; RMNZ: Platinum	Shoot for the Stars, Aim for the Moon
"Yea Yea" (Note: "Yea Yea" also appears on the EP Enjoy Yourself.)	2020	43	22	—	36	77	—	—	— (Note: "Yea Yea" did not enter the Swedish Singellista Chart, but peaked at number 19 on the Swedish Heatseeker Chart.)	—	—	RMNZ: Gold	Shoot for the Stars, Aim for the Moon
"Creature" (featuring Swae Lee) (Note: "Creature" also appears on the EP For the Night.)	2020	57	33	—	44	100	—	—	—	—	—		Shoot for the Stars, Aim for the Moon
"Snitching" (featuring Quavo and Future)	2020	54	30	—	51	122	—	—	—	—	—		Shoot for the Stars, Aim for the Moon
"West Coast Shit" (featuring Tyga and Quavo)	2020	65	37	—	48	153	—	—	—	—	—		Shoot for the Stars, Aim for the Moon
"Something Special" (Note: "Something Special" also appears on the EP Mood Swings.)	2020	41	21	60	33	103	—	40	— (Note: "Something Special" did not enter the Swedish Singellista Chart, but peaked at number five on the Swedish Heatseeker Chart.)	—	—	RIAA: Platinum; ARIA: Gold; BPI: Silver; RMNZ: Platinum	Shoot for the Stars, Aim for the Moon
"Diana" (featuring King Combs) (Note: "Diana" (remix featuring King Combs and Calboy) also appears on the EP Mood Swings.)	2020	76	42	—	71	—	—	—	—	—	—		Shoot for the Stars, Aim for the Moon
"Got It on Me" (Note: "Got It on Me" also appears on the EP For the Night.)	2020	31	15	59	14	82	—	— (Note: "Got It on Me" did not enter the NZ Top 40 Singles Chart, but peaked at number five on the NZ Hot Singles Chart.)	40	52	—	RIAA: Platinum; ARIA: Gold; BPI: Silver; GLF: Gold; RMNZ: Platinum; SNEP: Gold	Shoot for the Stars, Aim for the Moon
"Tunnel Vision" (Outro)	2020	79	43	—	57	185	—	—	—	—	—		Shoot for the Stars, Aim for the Moon
"Imperfections (Interlude)"	2020	—	—	—	—	—	—	—	—	—	—	RMNZ: Gold	Shoot for the Stars, Aim for the Moon
"Show Out" (with Kid Cudi and Skepta)	2020	54	12	—	42	78	29	— (Note: "Show Out" did not enter the NZ Top 40 Singles Chart, but peaked at number five on the NZ Hot Singles Chart.)	—	43	37	RMNZ: Gold	Man on the Moon III: The Chosen
"Burner on Deck" (Fredo featuring Pop Smoke and Young Adz)	2021	—	—	—	—	—	33	— (Note: "Burner on Deck" did not enter the NZ Top 40 Singles Chart, but peaked at number 24 on the NZ Hot Singles Chart.)	—	—	18		Money Can't Buy Happiness
"Clueless" (Polo G featuring Pop Smoke and Fivio Foreign)	2021	79	32	—	—	—	—	—	—	—	—		Hall of Fame
"Light It Up" (with Migos)	2021	— (Note: "Light It Up" did not enter the Billboard Hot 100, but peaked at number 14 on the Bubbling Under Hot 100 chart.)	—	—	79	—	—	—	—	—	—		Culture III
"More Time"	2021	80	31	—	37	119	—	—	— (Note: "More Time" did not enter the Swedish Singellista Chart, but peaked at number seven on the Swedish Heatseeker Chart.)	—	—		Faith
"Tell the Vision" (featuring Kanye West and Pusha T)	2021	49	16	47	19	96	62	— (Note: "Tell the Vision" did not enter the NZ Top 40 Singles Chart, but peaked at number three on the NZ Hot Singles Chart.)	65	50	55		Faith
"Manslaughter" (featuring Rick Ross and The-Dream)	2021	82	33	87	41	—	—	—	— (Note: "Manslaughter" did not enter the Swedish Singellista Chart, but peaked at number 10 on the Swedish Heatseeker Chart.)	—	—		Faith
"Bout a Million" (featuring 21 Savage and 42 Dugg)	2021	54	19	61	23	128	76	— (Note: "Bout a Million" did not enter the NZ Top 40 Singles Chart, but peaked at number five on the NZ Hot Singles Chart.)	— (Note: "Bout a Million" did not enter the Swedish Singellista Chart, but peaked at number three on the Swedish Heatseeker Chart.)	—	64		Faith
"Brush Em" (featuring Rah Swish)	2021	— (Note: "Brush Em" did not enter the Billboard Hot 100, but peaked at number one on the Bubbling Under Hot 100 chart.)	40	—	53	—	—	—	—	—	—		Faith
"Top Shotta" (with The Neptunes featuring Pusha T, Travi and Beam)	2021	— (Note: "Top Shotta" did not enter the Billboard Hot 100, but peaked at number 10 on the Bubbling Under Hot 100 chart.)	—	—	67	—	—	—	—	—	—		Faith
"30" (featuring Bizzy Banks)	2021	97	39	—	48	—	—	—	—	—	—		Faith
"Beat the Speaker"	2021	— (Note: "Beat the Speaker" did not enter the Billboard Hot 100, but peaked at number 16 on the Bubbling Under Hot 100 chart.)	—	—	75	—	—	—	—	—	—		Faith
"Coupe"	2021	— (Note: "Coupe" did not enter the Billboard Hot 100, but peaked at number four on the Bubbling Under Hot 100 chart.)	44	—	47	—	—	—	—	—	—		Faith
"What's Crackin" (featuring Takeoff)	2021	— (Note: "What's Crackin" did not enter the Billboard Hot 100, but peaked at number nine on the Bubbling Under Hot 100 chart.)	—	—	63	—	—	—	—	—	—		Faith
"Genius" (with Lil Tjay and Swae Lee)	2021	— (Note: "Genius" did not enter the Billboard Hot 100, but peaked at number five on the Bubbling Under Hot 100 chart.)	46	72	54	—	—	—	—	—	—		Faith
"Spoiled" (featuring Pharrell)	2021	—	—	—	99	—	—	—	—	—	—		Faith
"Back Door" (featuring Quavo and Kodak Black)	2021	— (Note: "Back Door" did not enter the Billboard Hot 100, but peaked at number 20 on the Bubbling Under Hot 100 chart.)	—	—	86	—	—	—	—	—	—		Faith
"Merci Beaucoup"	2021	— (Note: "Merci Beaucoup" did not enter the Billboard Hot 100, but peaked at number 23 on the Bubbling Under Hot 100 chart.)	—	—	76	109	—	—	—	—	—		Faith
"Tell the Vision" (Kanye West featuring Pop Smoke)	2021	90	40	69	71	—	—	—	—	—	—		Donda
"—" denotes items which were not released in that country or failed to chart.

== Guest appearances ==
List of non-single guest appearances, with other performing artists, showing year released and album name
Title	Year	Other artists	Album
"Gatti"	2019	JackBoys, Travis Scott	JackBoys
"Run It Up"	2020	Nav	Good Intentions
"Zoo York"	2020	Lil Tjay, Fivio Foreign	State of Emergency
"Talk With The WOOs (Intro)" (Note: Uncredited. Phone call with Rah Swish.)	2020	Rah Swish	WOO Forever
"Show Out"	2020	Kid Cudi, Skepta	Man on the Moon III: The Chosen
"Burner on Deck"	2021	Fredo, Young Adz	Money Can't Buy Happiness
"Fashion"	2021	Polo G	Boogie: The Original Motion Picture Soundtrack
"No Cap" (Remix)	2021	M24	Boogie: The Original Motion Picture Soundtrack
"Light It Up"	2021	Migos	Culture III
"Clueless"	2021	Polo G, Fivio Foreign	Hall of Fame
"Lane Switcha"	2021	Skepta, ASAP Rocky, Juicy J, Project Pat	F9: The Fast Saga
"Tell the Vision"	2021	Kanye West	Donda
"Stuck in the Jungle"	2021	French Montana, Lil Durk	They Got Amnesia
"Remember"	2022	Nigo	I Know Nigo!
"Aqui Ta Smoke"	2023	El Alfa, Junior H	El Rey del Dembow

== Music videos ==
Title	Year	Director(s)	Ref.
As lead artist
"MPR (Panic Part 3 Remix)"	2019	V.LENS	
"Flexing"	2019	GoodyGoody	
"Meet the Woo"	2019	GoodyGoody	
"Welcome to the Party"	2019	GoodyGoody	
"Dior"	2019	JLShotThat	
"War"	2019	JLShotThat	
"Gatti"	2019	Cactus Jack and White Trash Tyler	
"Christopher Walking"	2020	Brennan Rowe	
"Shake the Room"	2020	Virgil Abloh	
"Got It on Me"	2020	Oliver Cannon, JLShotThat, Onetake, and Badmo	
"The Woo"	2020	Eif Rivera	
"Mood Swings"	2020	David Wept	
"Diana (remix)"	2020	Brilliant Garcia	
"Aim for the Moon"	2020	Oliver Cannon	
"What You Know Bout Love"	2020	Oliver Cannon	
"AP"	2021	Transition Ninja and Steady Prime	
"Mr. Jones"	2021	HidJi	
"Coupe"	2021	JL Shot That	
"Demeanor"	2021	Nabil Elderkin	
As featured artist
"Zoo York" (Lil Tjay featuring Fivio Foreign and Pop Smoke)	2020	Bordeaux & Non Native	
"Blask Mask" (Jay Gwuapo featuring Pop Smoke)	2020	Unknown	
"Double G" (French Montana featuring Pop Smoke)	2020	Unknown	
"50K" (Trap Manny featuring Pop Smoke)	2021	Aala Sady	
