= AP (song) =

2021 single by Pop Smoke

Single by Pop Smoke

from the album Boogie
- Released: February 26, 2021
- Genre: Drill
- Length: 2:51
- Label: Victor Victor; Republic
- Songwriters: Bashar Jackson; Andre Loblack; Ricardo Lamarre; Steven Victor
- Producers: 808Melo; Rico Beats

Pop Smoke singles chronology
"Hello" (2021)	"AP" (2021)	"Mr. Jones" (2021)

"AP" is a song by American rapper Pop Smoke. It was released on February 26, 2021, through Victor Victor Worldwide and Republic Records. It is the lead single from the Boogie soundtrack, in which Pop Smoke stars.

== Background and release ==
The song first originated as a collaboration with Rich the Kid, who previewed the song in April 2020 when it was called "Nikes". On February 25, 2021, Victor Victor Worldwide and Republic Records announced the song would be the lead single from the Boogie soundtrack. It was released on February 26, 2021.

== Music and lyrics ==
Musically, "AP" is a drill track. Aleia Woods from XXL stated that the track consists of "Pop Smoke's signature grit and growl over a grim and bass-heavy beat". Wongo Okon of Uproxx wrote Pop Smoke "flaunts his lavish lifestyle and raps about his jewelry, money, and more". Pop Smoke raps on the hook: "AP, Spicy/I bust a check in my Nikes. Am I a killa? Might be/Two tone, icy."

== Promotion ==
The lyric video for "AP" shows footage from the movie of Pop Smoke as well as behind-the-scenes photos.

== Critical reception ==
Zoe Haylock of Vulture described the song as an "intimidating anthem".

== Credits and personnel ==
Credits adapted from Tidal.

- Pop Smoke – vocals, songwriter
- 808Melo – production, programming, songwriter
- Rico Beats – production, programming, vocal programming, songwriter
- Steven Victor – songwriter
- Jaycen Joshua – mastering engineer, mixing engineer

== Charts ==
Chart performance for "AP"
Chart (2021)	Peak position
Australia (ARIA)	82
Canada Hot 100 (Billboard)	30
Germany (GfK)	85
Global 200 (Billboard)	59
Iceland (Tónlistinn)	27
Ireland (IRMA)	61
Lithuania (AGATA)	75
Netherlands (Single Top 100)	73
New Zealand Hot Singles (RMNZ)	4
Sweden Heatseeker (Sverigetopplistan)	9
Switzerland (Schweizer Hitparade)	41
UK Singles (Official Charts)	56
UK Hip Hop/R&B (Official Charts)	38
US Billboard Hot 100	64
US Hot R&B/Hip-Hop Songs (Billboard)	24
