= Tell the Vision =

2021 song by Pop Smoke featuring Kanye West and Pusha T

Song by Pop Smoke featuring Kanye West and Pusha T (Note: West is the only credited artist on the Donda version.)

from the album Faith and Donda
- Released: July 16, 2021
- Recorded: 2020
- Genre: Drill
- Length: 3:35; 1:44 (Donda version)
- Label: Victor Victor; Republic
- Songwriters: Bashar Jackson; Kanye West; Terrence Thornton; Ricardo Lamarre; Michael Mulé; Isaac de Boni; Steven Victor; Orlando Tucker; Jahmal Gwin; Jalil Peraza; Ross Portaro
- Producers: Kanye West; Boogz; FnZ; Rico Beats; SethInTheKitchen

Music video
- "Tell the Vision" on YouTube

"Tell the Vision" is a song by American rapper Pop Smoke featuring fellow American rappers Kanye West and Pusha T from the former's second posthumous studio album, Faith (2021). West produced the song with Boogz, FnZ, Rico Beats, and SethInTheKitchen, while Jalil Peraza and Jess Jackson served as additional producers. A drill track, it samples a choir and Angie Martinez's ode to Pop Smoke. In the lyrics of the song, the rapper discusses his upbringing in Brooklyn and the struggles he experienced during this period.

Some music critics praised the song's lyrical content, while others criticized the process behind it. In the United States, "Tell the Vision" charted at number 49 on the Billboard Hot 100. It also scored top 50 positions in Australia, Canada, Greece, and Switzerland, alongside reaching number 33 on the Billboard Global 200. An alternative version of the song was released on West's tenth studio album, Donda (2021). The version features a tweaked beat that includes a piano loop, accompanying the vocals that are solely performed by Pop Smoke. Most reviewers complained about the rapper being disused, while a couple of them expressed disappointment in the lack of drums. The version charted at number 90 on the Billboard Hot 100, while reaching number 69 in Australia.

== Background and development ==
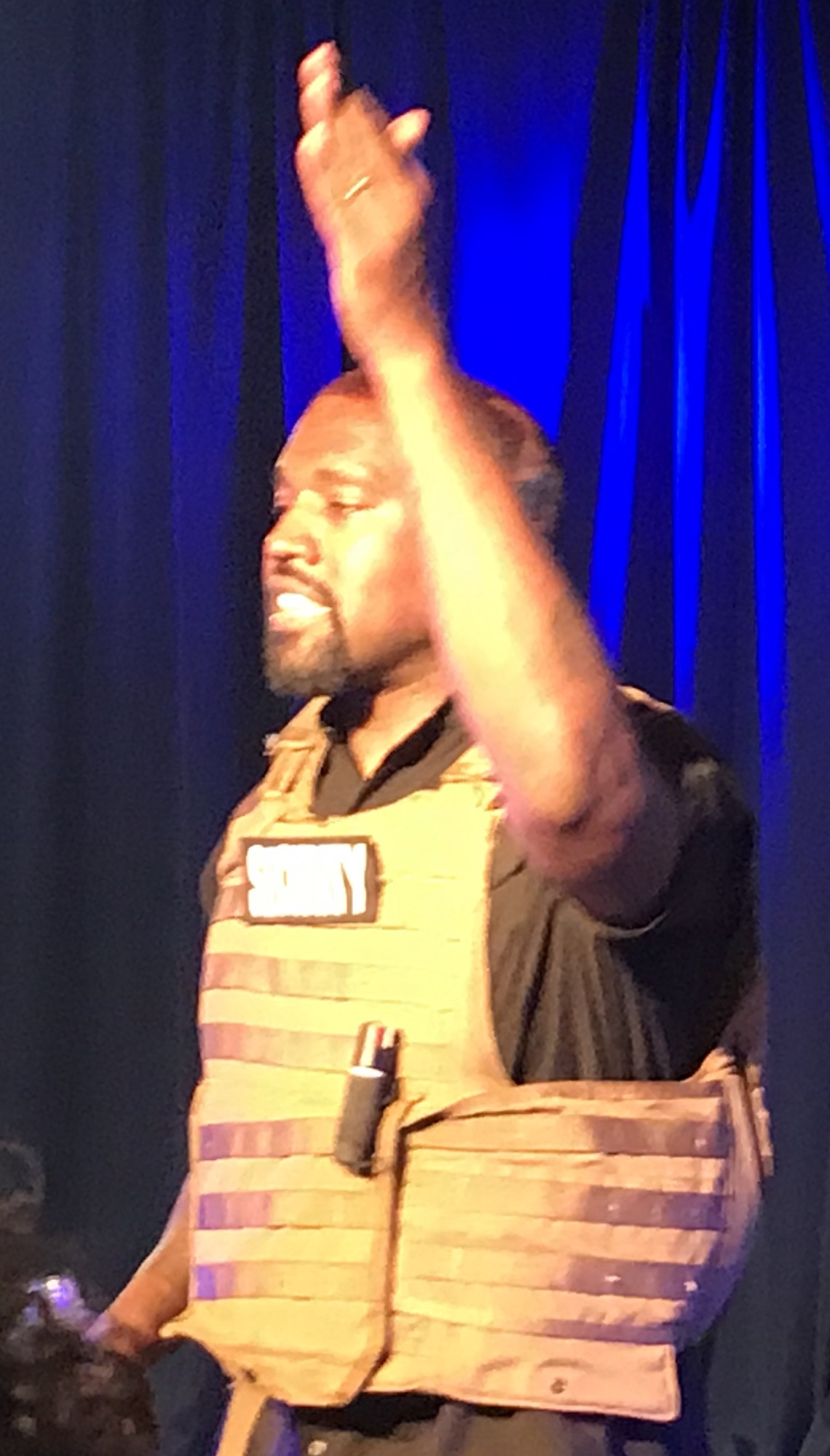
The song was initially set to be released on Kanye West's 2021 album Donda, though an alternate version was ultimately issued on the album.

Alongside "Tell the Vision", Pusha T appears on fellow Faith track "Top Shotta". He had previously recorded a verse for Pop Smoke's track "Paranoia" that was not released on his debut posthumous studio album Shoot for the Stars, Aim for the Moon (2020) because of a glitch, though it leaked in July 2020. The song was included on the deluxe edition of the album, to which Pusha T responded by "demand[ing]" Victor for the removal of his verse "to avoid any confusion that may take away from this amazing body of work!"

On July 15, 2021, Pop Smoke's manager Steven Victor revealed Faith's track list via his Instagram that includes the song with features from West and Pusha T. It was produced by West, BoogzDaBeast under the moniker of Boogz, FnZ, Rico Beats, and SethInTheKitchen, with additional production from Jalil Peraza and Jess Jackson. West later unveiled a collaboration with Pop Smoke for Donda during the album's second listening party at Mercedes-Benz Stadium in Atlanta on August 6, 2021, which excited the crowd. An alternate version of "Tell the Vision" was ultimately included as the album's 19th track on August 29, 2021. A tribute to Pop Smoke, it was produced by West and BoogzDaBeast, while co-produced by FnZ and Ojivolta. The version only includes Pop Smoke's vocals, removing West and Pusha T's performances, though credits the former of the two as the sole artist. It has a shortened length of one minute and forty-four seconds (1:44), and a much simpler, piano-based instrumental

== Music and lyrics ==
Musically, "Tell the Vision" is a drill track. During the breaks in its beat, a choir sample is present. The song uses a synth-pop production that features the use of drill drums, lurching synths, choral flourishes, and interspersed spoken testimonials. West begins the song's intro, before it slows down. The intro then features a sample of Power 105.1 host Angie Martinez delivering an ode to Pop Smoke, which aired the day after he died. This is followed by Pop Smoke performing the first verse, the chorus, and an interlude, preceding Pusha T rapping the song's second verse. The song's alternate version is a drill interlude with no drums and features a tweaked beat from West that is reliant on a piano loop, accompanied by quick, fragmented hi-hats. The version's sole verse is performed by Pop Smoke, whose vocals are altered through processing.

Throughout "Tell the Vision", Pop Smoke raps about his early life in Brooklyn, New York, the struggles he faced at the time, and his favorite name-brand designers. The rapper also references having gone from the bottom to the top: "Look, I remember the days, same 'fit for a week straight/I used to eat 50-cent cake, now, it's Philippe's/It's Philippe's for the steak and hella thots up in the Wraith." The track begins with West uttering ad-libs-filled lines: "Trippin/Wildin' on television, You could/Still see a nigga tell the vision/Pimpin'/Boy, these boys, pimpin'/Different/ These boys, boys." Pusha T pays his respect to Pop Smoke, while mentioning fellow rapper Tyler, the Creator's sixth studio album Call Me If You Get Lost (2021), hailing it the best album of the year so far. He raps about Faith competing against Call Me If You Get Lost, alluding to the former potentially going platinum. Pusha T then hints at releasing an album soon after: "Look, Tyler got the album of the year, for now/But Pop about to drop, I see the platinum in the clouds/Now Push about to drop, so real trappers stick around." The rapper also affirms "the crown is only for the king, they tryna place it on a clown", which was speculated to be a diss to Canadian musician Drake.

== Release and reception ==
On July 16, 2021, Pop Smoke's second posthumous studio album Faith was released, including "Tell the Vision" as the third track. In Rolling Stone, Mosi Reeves hypothesized that the line "I see the platinum in the clouds" is about Faith potentially having "the same commercial heights" as Shoot for the Stars, Aim for the Moon. Wongo Okon from Uproxx saw the song as an appropriate fit "in the drill rap pocket" that Pop Smoke was successful in before dying "as he raps about the struggles he faced growing up". Writing for Variety, A.D. Amorosi perceived that Pusha T gets the most controversy during the song through his lyrical performance. Craig Jenkins of Vulture said the song is "so crowded and outrageous and spirited and weird there's almost not even time to stew about mortality". He continued, saying it is"the most alluring ratio of wild ideas to improbable successes" and manages to traverse "multiple microgenres at the same time". Robin Murray from Clash stated the song "is simply a moment for the history books".

Alex Zidel, for HotNewHipHop, stated that even though listening to "Tell the Vision" seems "bittersweet", Pop Smoke's team "did a great job putting [it] together". Antoine-Samuel Mauffette Alavo of Exclaim! assumed that even though Pusha T "rarely misses in the lyrical department", he should not have been included on "Tell the Vision" and "Top Shotta" since fellow Pop Smoke collaborator Fivio Foreign did not get included on the album. At HipHopDX, Anthony Malone thought the song goes "downhill immediately" once West "decides to screech phrases". Alphonse Pierre for Pitchfork stated the track's energy is akin to that "of a college paper struggling to hit the word count" and believed the record label was disinterested in how it sounded like, estimating "it's just there" for the purpose of "fill[ing] space and generat[ing] clicks". Preezy Brown of Vibe described the track as a "standout". Alex Suskind and Jason Lamphier for Entertainment Weekly mentioned it was "a sad but celebratory cut".

In regards to the Donda version of the track, Matthew Ismael Ruiz of Pitchfork was disgusted by one of Pop Smoke's last performances in "Tell the Vision" amounting to "an aimless interlude" with the alternate version, condemning this as "a crime against hip-hop" and also disliking the lack of drums. In a review of Donda for The New York Times, Jon Caramanica saw the song as a "recycled" collaboration between West and Pop Smoke, perceiving it to be "purely decorative". Expressing a similar sentiment at Slate, Carl Wilson affirmed that the "recycled" track "could have been jettisoned easily". Billboard reviewer Michael Saponara ranked the track as the 26th best on the album, viewing it as "more of an interlude or bridge than a legit track" from Pop Smoke. Mano Sundaresan from NPR felt assured that the track is "one of the worst pieces of posthumous rap" he has ever listened to, citing "its plodding piano instrumental" and the lack of drums.

== Commercial performance ==
Following the release of Faith, "Tell the Vision" entered the US Billboard Hot 100 at number 49. The track lasted for one week on the Hot 100. At the same time as its entry, the track debuted at number 16 on the US Hot R&B/Hip-Hop Songs chart. It performed best in Canada, reaching number 19 on the Canadian Hot 100. In total, the track lasted for four weeks on the chart.

In Australia, the track peaked at number 47 on the ARIA Singles Chart. It entered the Greece International Digital Singles Chart at number 25 on the issue for the 28th week of 2021, before rising four places to number 21 the following week. It was less successful in Switzerland, charting at number 50 on the Swiss Hitparade Singles Top 75. Similarly, the track reached number 55 on the UK Singles Chart. On the Billboard Global 200, it debuted at number 33. The song's alternate version opened at number 90 on the Billboard Hot 100, alongside entering the Canadian Hot 100 at number 71. The version reached number 69 on the ARIA Singles Chart.

== Personnel ==
Credits adapted from Tidal.

- Kanye West – producer, songwriter, featured artist, programmer
- Boogz – producer, songwriter, programmer
- FnZ – producer, songwriter, programmer
- Rico Beats – producer, songwriter, programmer
- SethInTheKitchen – producer, songwriter, programmer
- Jalil Peraza – additional producer, songwriter
- Jess Jackson – additional producer, mastering engineer, mix engineer
- Bashar Jackson – songwriter, vocalist
- Pusha T – songwriter, vocalist
- Ross Portaro – songwriter
- Steven Victor – songwriter
- Ciel Eckard-Lee – assistant mixer
- David Bone – assistant mixer
- Chris Ku – recording engineer
- Dave Cook – recording engineer
- Jordan Franzino – recording engineer
- Randy "Enzo" Bondurant – recording engineer
- Vic Wainstein – recording engineer
- Samuel Jackson - songwriter, producer

== Charts ==
=== Weekly charts ===
Chart performance for Faith version
Chart (2021)	Peak position
Australia (ARIA)	47
Canada Hot 100 (Billboard)	19
France (SNEP)	96
Global 200 (Billboard)	33
Ireland (IRMA)	62
Netherlands (Single Top 100)	61
Greece International Digital Singles (IFPI)	21
New Zealand Hot Singles (RMNZ)	3
Portugal (AFP)	76
South Africa (TOSAC)	33
Sweden (Sverigetopplistan)	65
Switzerland (Schweizer Hitparade)	50
UK Singles (Official Charts)	55
UK Hip Hop/R&B (Official Charts)	19
US Billboard Hot 100	49
US Hot R&B/Hip-Hop Songs (Billboard)	16

Chart performance for Donda version
Chart (2021)	Peak position
Australia (ARIA)	69
Canada Hot 100 (Billboard)	71
Global 200 (Billboard)	86
Lithuania (AGATA)	99
UK R&B (OCC)	31
US Billboard Hot 100	90
US Hot Christian Songs (Billboard)	23
US Gospel Songs (Billboard)	23
US Hot R&B/Hip-Hop Songs (Billboard)	40

=== Year-end charts ===
2021 year-end chart performance for Donda version
Chart (2021)	Position
US Christian Songs (Billboard)	85
US Gospel Songs (Billboard)	41
