= Faith (Pop Smoke album) =

Studio album by Pop Smoke
- Released: July 16, 2021
- Genres: Drill; trap; hip hop
- Length: 56:04
- Labels: Victor Victor; Republic
- Producers: 2300; 808MeloBeats; Avenue Beatz; Axl; Boogz; CashMoneyAP; Daoud; Dru Decaro; Jake One; Jahlil Beats; Jess Jackson; JMoney; JW Lucas; FnZ; Foreign Teck; Fritz tha Producer; Kanye West; Kidd Fredo; Mantra; Michael Gomes; Musicman Ty; The Neptunes; Nicholas Britell; Rico Beats; Ryan Press; SethInTheKitchen; Swizz Beatz; Tahj Money; TNT

Pop Smoke chronology
| Shoot for the Stars, Aim for the Moon (2020) | Faith (2021) |

Singles from Faith
- 1. "Mr. Jones" Released: July 16, 2021; 2. "Demeanor" Released: July 20, 2021; 3. "Woo Baby" Released: July 22, 2021; 4. "Bad Boys" Released: July 30, 2021

Faith is the second and final studio album by American rapper Pop Smoke. It was posthumously released on July 16, 2021, by Victor Victor Worldwide and Republic Records. The deluxe edition of the album that includes four additional tracks was released on what would have been Pop Smoke's 22nd birthday, July 20, 2021. On July 30, six additional tracks were added, including the late rapper's hit single "Dior", from his breakout 2019 mixtape Meet the Woo. The album's guest appearances include Kanye West, Pusha T, Rick Ross, The-Dream, 42 Dugg, 21 Savage, Rah Swish, Travi, Beam, The Neptunes, Bizzy Banks, Takeoff, Lil Tjay, Swae Lee, Future, Chris Brown, Dua Lipa, Pharrell, Kid Cudi, Quavo, and Kodak Black. The deluxe edition adds additional appearances from G Herbo, OnPointLikeOP, Killa, Dread Woo, Tayy Floss, Fetty Luciano, Anuel AA, and Obasi Jackson. Faith is a drill, trap, and hip hop record with elements of pop-trap, gospel, and pop.

A total of four singles were released throughout July 2021. "Mr. Jones" featuring American rapper Future was released as the lead single the same day as the album. It peaked at number 71 on the US Billboard Hot 100 and number 70 on the Billboard Global 200. "Demeanor" featuring English singer Dua Lipa was released to rhythmic contemporary and contemporary hit radio formats in the United States on July 20, 2021, as Faith's second single. It peaked at number 86 on the Billboard Hot 100 and number 14 on the UK Singles Chart. "Woo Baby" featuring American singer Chris Brown was also sent to American rhythmic contemporary radio as the album's third single on July 22, 2021. The song peaked at number 64 on the Billboard Hot 100 and number four on the Billboard airplay Rhythmic chart.

Faith received generally mixed reviews from music critics. Some criticized the production and considered the album unfinished. Others criticized the number of features and called it a cash grab. Entertainment Weekly, HipHopDX, and Yardbarker placed Faith on their lists of worst albums of 2021, while Capital Xtra placed the album on their best albums of 2021 list. Despite it getting mixed reviews, the album was a commercial success, debuting at number one on the US Billboard 200 and giving the late rapper his second US number-one hit. Pop Smoke became the first artist in history to have his first two albums posthumously debut at number one on the Billboard 200. The album also peaked at number one on the US Billboard Top R&B/Hip-Hop Albums and Canadian Albums Chart. It reached the top-10 of 17 other regions, including the United Kingdom, Australia, and Ireland.

== Background ==
After American rapper Pop Smoke was shot and killed at the age of 20 during a home invasion, fellow American rapper 50 Cent decided to help finish the late rapper's album Shoot for the Stars, Aim for the Moon by serving as executive producer. After the album was released on July 3, 2020, it was a commercial success, debuting at number one on the US Billboard 200, and spawning four US Billboard Hot 100 top 20 singles "For the Night", "What You Know Bout Love", "The Woo", and "Mood Swings". The album helped Pop Smoke win Top Billboard 200 Album and Top Rap Album at the 2021 Billboard Music Awards.

On May 1, 2021, American producer Rico Beats hinted at the release of another posthumous Pop Smoke album. The producer posted a mirror selfie and added, "I see and hear everything kept it cool tho no worries pay back around the corner Pop smoke new album loading". After Rico Beats indicated the release of Pop Smoke's second album, 50 Cent told radio personality Kris Kaylin in an interview that he was unsure if he would be involved and executive produce it. On June 4, Haitian-American record executive Steven Victor announced that there would be a second posthumous project released. Rico Beats announced that Faith was "95% loading the fuck up" and also confirmed that he would be one of the producers on the album through a post on Instagram on June 15.

== Music and lyrics ==
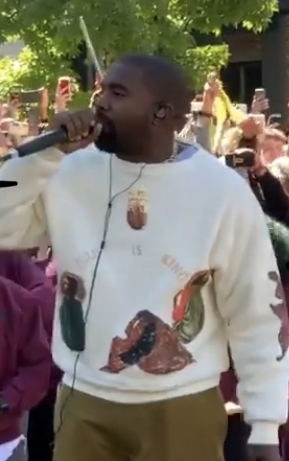
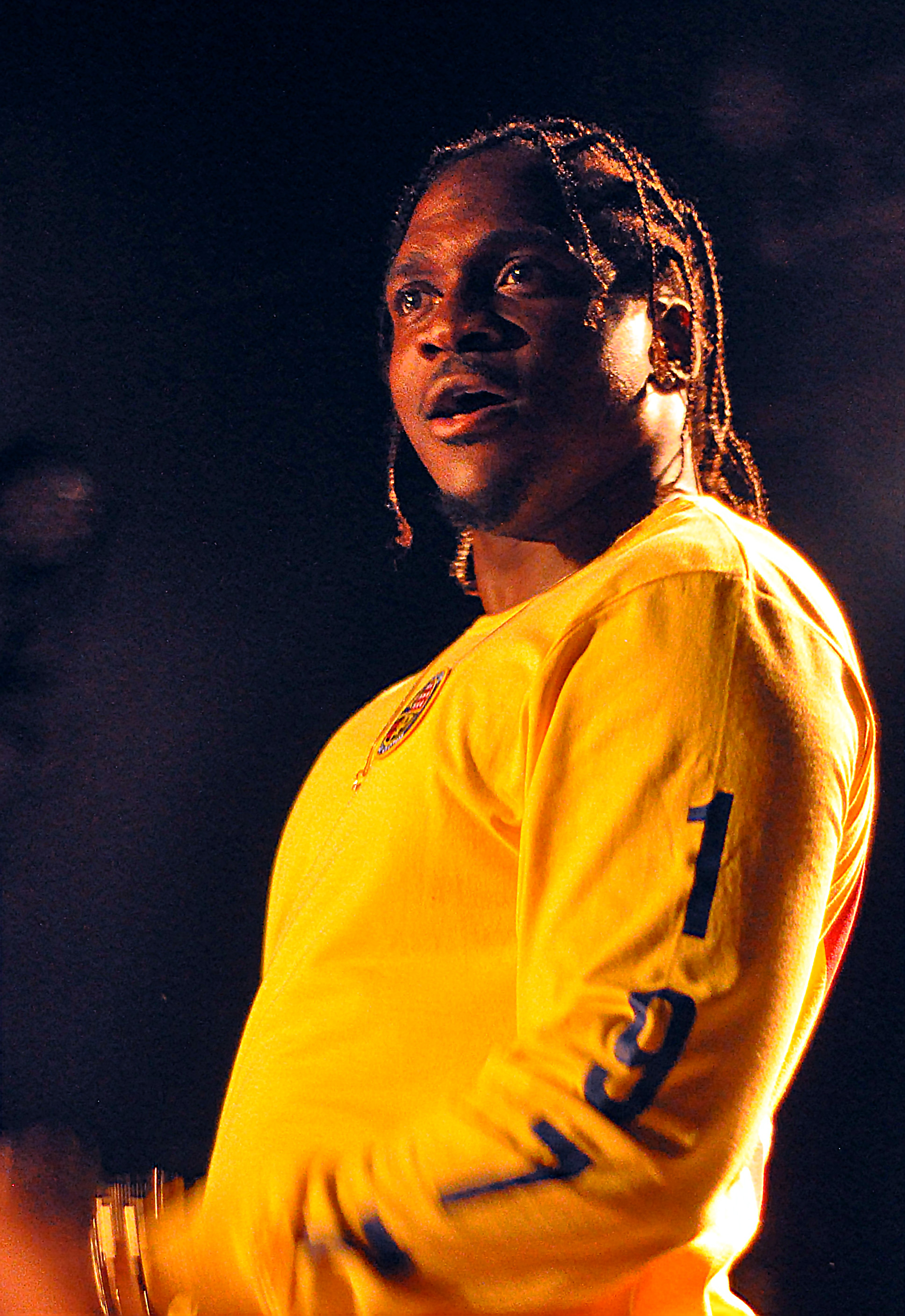
"Tell the Vision" features vocals from Kanye West (left, in 2019) and Pusha T (right, in 2015).

Faith is a drill, trap, and hip hop record, with the songs containing elements of pop-trap, gospel, and pop. The album opens up with the gospel-influenced spoken word and soul intro "Good News". The intro features Pop Smoke's mother speaking over the instrumentals of her son's 2019 single "Welcome to the Party" while explaining the reasoning behind the album's title and explains Pop Smoke had a natural drive, a drive to materialize greatness and to show his listeners that they, too, can achieve greatness. In the following track "More Time", Pop Smoke raps about being a confident man on the streets while trying to honor his mother's wishes. It consists of reverberating keys added by American composer Nicholas Britell. "Tell the Vision" featuring Kanye West and Pusha T is a drill track that uses a synth-pop production and features the use of drill drums, lurching synths, choral flourishes, and interspersed spoken testimonials. In the song, West raps the intro while it features a sample of Power 105.1 host Angie Martinez delivering an ode to Pop Smoke. Pop Smoke raps about his early life in Brooklyn, New York, and the struggles he faced at the time, while Pusha T disses Canadian musician Drake and hints on releasing an album soon. "Manslaughter" featuring Rick Ross and The-Dream is an R&B, hip-hop, and pop track that features strings and downbeat percussion. The rappers discuss how they would go to great lengths to defend their loved ones. Pop Smoke sings of being willing to commit a crime if someone upsets him or his family. The song initially had a different beat and featured Dread Woo and Dafi Woo, however Victor explained that they couldn't clear the sample.

"Bout a Million" featuring 21 Savage and 42 Dugg is a chamber folk, ambient, and drill track with braggadocio, a lead guitar, and 808's. Its lyrics are about the three rappers flexing their expensive jewels and lifestyles, and their upbringing and experiences throughout different places in the United States. "Brush Em" featuring Rah Swish is a drill track that uses percussion. Pop Smoke and Rah Swish both rap about their dangerous tendencies and about the streets of Brooklyn. "Top Shotta" with The Neptunes, featuring Pusha T, Travi, and Beam is a dancehall-inspired drill track that utilizes a tropical beat and caribbean-style steel drums. The track was originally supposed to feature American rapper Eli Fross. "30" featuring Bizzy Banks is a drill song with interplay between the two rappers. It is followed by drill track "Beat the Speaker", in which Pop Smoke raps about the death of Kenneka Jenkins. "Coupe" has the use of looping 808's, while the lyrics discuss the themes of celebrity excess. Pop Smoke raps "Don't run in my crib, I'll put guns to your head" before a brief pause in the music to emphasize the line's profundity. Robin Murray from Clash stated that "Coupe" and "Beat the Speaker" are "freestyle[s] carved out into individual track[s]". "What's Crackin" featuring Takeoff is a trap song that uses bells in the background. "Genius" featuring Lil Tjay and Swae Lee is a drill song. HotNewHipHop author Aron A. expressed that "[Lil] Tjay and Swae Lee's contributions electrify through smooth vocal performances". "Mr. Jones" featuring Future sees both rappers rap about their lavish lifestyles and pursuit for self-gratification. "Woo Baby Interlude" is sung A cappella and was originally called "Tiger". According to Antoine-Samuel Mauffette Alavo of Exclaim!, the song is "raw and uncut". "Woo Baby" featuring Chris Brown is an R&B and trap song. The song uses an uncredited sample of American singer-songwriter Ne-Yo's 2005 number one hit single "So Sick".

"Demeanor" featuring Dua Lipa is an electropop and disco-pop song that uses a bassline, rhythm guitar, drums, funky groove and bounce, woozy vibes, and rhythmic verses. It contains a spliced-in verse from an unreleased Pop Smoke track called "Face2Face". In the song, Pop Smoke sings about how women enjoy the way he acts and being intoxicated. The late artist then raps about suffering through poverty. Lipa gets her own verse as she sings: "You can't say Pop without Smoke", referring to Pop Smoke's line "You cannot say Pop and forget the Smoke" in his 2019 song "Gatti" with JackBoys and Travis Scott. "Spoiled" featuring Pharrell is a pop, funk and R&B song with keyboard melodies. Its lyrics discuss women as being spoiled. "8-Ball" featuring Kid Cudi is a Latin and drone-influenced blues and Middle Eastern track that features a guitar and elastic bassline. Both Pop Smoke and Kid Cudi rap about luck, loss and love. Udit Mahalingan of The Line of Best Fit stated that "Back Door" featuring Quavo and Kodak Black is about a "piece of maternal advice into a meditation on the urban New York experience". Faith closes with the lofi hip hop and trap song "Merci Beaucoup", which stands for "thank you very much" in French. It makes use of a UK drill-style bassline and sonic undertones. Pop Smoke raps about attacking his enemies, taking their jewelry, and women wanting to be with him. It then transitions to a spoken word outro, in which Pop Smoke stands on his accomplishments and predicts more, emphasizing his loyalty to his goal. Rolling Stone author Milan Kordestani opined that Pop Smoke is "clearly speaking to his target audience" during "Merci Beaucoup". Kordestani recognized that Pop Smoke was "referencing his marketing strategy at the same time". The author concludes that when Pop Smoke writes his lyrics, he isn't thinking about the 'masses'; instead, he is thinking about the people in his hometown of Brooklyn, New York. He's aiming for an audience that will want to hear his distinct lyrics and voice.

=== Bonus tracks ===
The first new track on the deluxe edition of Faith is "Questions". Pop Smoke sings about being emotional and vulnerable. The track interpolates 50 Cent's 2003 number one hit single "21 Questions". "Run Down" featuring OnPointLikeOP and G Herbo has Pop Smoke rap about hunting down his enemies while G Herbo pays tribute to the late rapper. Alexander Cole for HotNewHipHop stated that "Money Man" featuring Killa has "high-flying production all while Pop Smoke and Killa bring some hungry energy to the mix". "Defiant" and "Rumble" include further contributions from Dread Woo, Travi, and Tay Floss, respectively. "Don't Know Em" featuring Rah Swish sees Pop Smoke raps the lyrics: "'Man, I'm fuckin' gone nigga, Yo Rah, we outta here nigga, it is (Ayo, pull up we at the spot gang), I can barely walk nigga (Like stand the fuck up nigga, 'cause I got you, look)." "Mr. Jones" featuring Anuel AA is a remixed version of the original track. "Double It" featuring Fetty Luciano is an uptempo song, in which, according to Karen Civil, Pop Smoke "lays the intro as Fetty [Luciano] floats all over the solid production". "Bad Boys" features Pop Smoke's brother Obasi Jackson. Last year, Jackson previewed the original verse for Pop Smoke's 2020 hit single "Dior". He would later flip the original verse and place it on "Bad Boys". Pop Smoke delivers his verse for the beginning of the track, before his brother raps for the rest of the song. The deluxe version of Faith closes with "Dior", a drill and hip hop song with lyrics about flirting with women and buying the latest designer clothes.

== Cover artwork ==
On July 13, 2021, Pop Smoke's team unveiled the album cover, which is a close-up of Pop Smoke in a black-and-white photo, with the word "Faith" tattooed above his left eyebrow. The cover art was originally taken by photographer Flixz, who snapped photos of Pop Smoke at a nightclub. The late rapper wore a collared unbuttoned Dior shirt with a set of chains in the original photo.

== Release and promotion ==
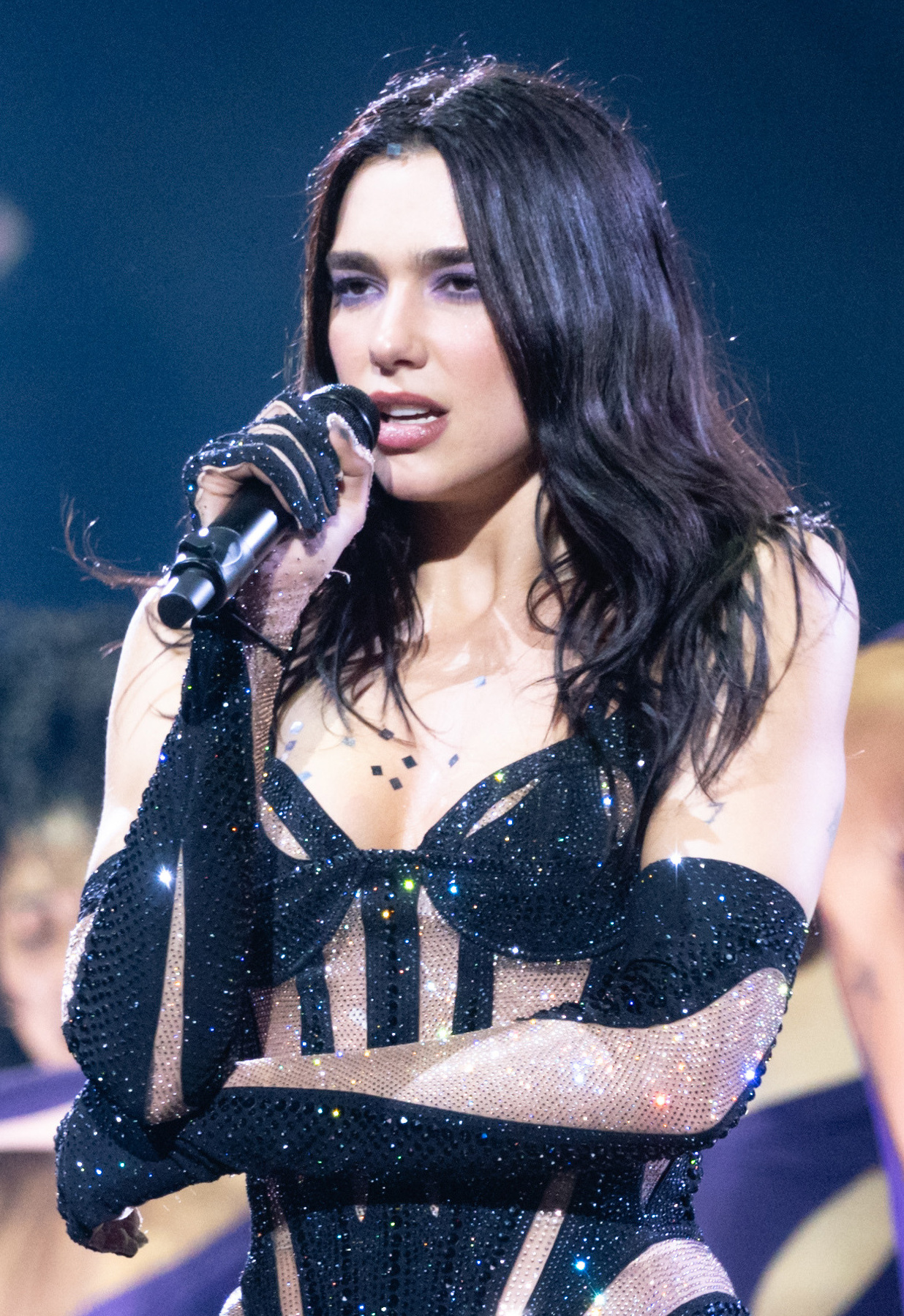
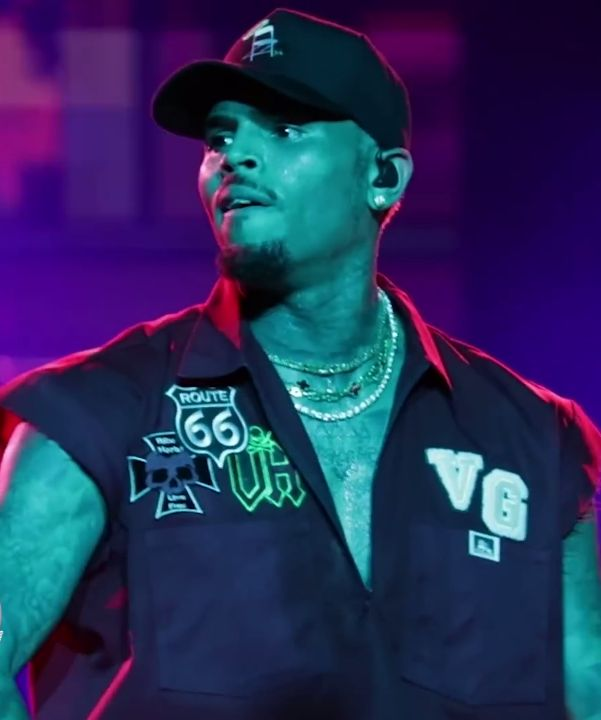
English pop singer Dua Lipa (left, in 2022) is featured on Faith's second single "Demeanor" while American R&B singer Chris Brown (right, in 2023) is featured on the album's third single "Woo Baby"

On June 23, 2021, Victor announced the album's release date of July 16, 2021. A trailer video for Faith, which features Pop Smoke's career highlights and a motivational short speech from him, was also released. A 30-second promotional single, "Outro", was released on July 4, 2021. In the promotional single, Pop Smoke talks about following your dreams and not giving up. Initially, it was assumed that the album would be self-titled after Pop Smoke was the title of the album on Apple Music during its pre-order as a placeholder. Victor announced on July 11 that the album would be titled Faith. The following day, the cover art was revealed along with a promotional video. On July 10, posters started going up in New York City and Los Angeles in support of the album. According to reports, the ads had QR codes in them that could be accessed through Snapchat. With the app open, a video sample of the late rapper's new song would begin to play. Pop Smoke is seen rapping to an unreleased track on stage and in the studio in black-and-white video footage. The track list was released on July 14, in what was considered an "unusual" way; it was revealed through an interactive website that allowed fans to scratch virtual lottery tickets to reveal the track titles. On July 20, 2021, a deluxe version of Faith, which features four additional tracks, was released on what would have been Pop Smoke's 22nd birthday. On July 30, 2021, six additional tracks were added, including "Dior".

"Mr. Jones" was released as the lead single the same day as the album. The song debuted and peaked at number 71 on the US Billboard Hot 100 and number 70 on the Billboard Global 200. A music video for the song was released on the same day. The visual features stock and archival footage of Pop Smoke at the Mr. Jones nightclub in Miami, Florida, while showing Future hanging out with a plethora of women. On July 20, 2021, "Demeanor" was sent to American rhythmic contemporary and contemporary hit radio as the album's second single. The song also impacted contemporary hit radio in Italy on July 23, 2021. It debuted and peaked at number 86 on the Billboard Hot 100 and number 62 on the Billboard Global 200. After it was released as a single, the song peaked within the top 30 of the Billboard airplay Rhythmic and Mainstream Top 40 charts. In the United Kingdom, "Demeanor" debuted and peaked at number 14, making it the highest new entry on the chart dated July 25, 2021. A music video for the song was released on Pop Smoke's YouTube channel on July 29, 2021, and was directed by Australian-American director Nabil Elderkin. In the visual, Pop Smoke is a ghost and is seen on a medieval tableau that comes to life and depicts different versions of him, as well as white doves flying around in the painting. Lipa wears a vintage corset-style lace-trimmed ballgown from Jean Paul Gaultier's Spring 1998 couture collection, which was inspired by Marie Antoinette and the Age of Enlightenment, as she does different activities and dances throughout the visual. "Woo Baby" was also sent to American rhythmic contemporary radio as Faith's third single on July 22, 2021. The song debuted and peaked at number 64 on the Billboard Hot 100 and number 49 on the Billboard Global 200. "Woo Baby" peaked at number four on the Billboard airplay Rhythmic chart, giving Pop Smoke his fifth top-10 hit on the chart. "Bad Boys" was released as the album's fourth and final single on July 30, 2021.

A music video for "Coupe" was released on July 21, 2021. The video was directed by JLShotThat. The visual takes place in Pop Smoke's hometown of Canarsie, Brooklyn and was primarily filmed at a basketball court in the late rapper's neighborhood. The visual sees a group of people celebrating Pop Smoke's birthday and legacy, while riding cars and bikes through the streets.

== Critical reception ==
Professional ratings
Aggregate scores
| Source | Rating |
|---|---|
| AnyDecentMusic? | 5.6/10 |
| Metacritic | 53/100 |
Review scores
| Source | Rating |
| AllMusic | 1.5/5 stars |
| Clash | 8/10 |
| Cult MTL | 4.5/10 |
| Exclaim! | 5/10 |
| HipHopDX | 2.5/5 |
| The Line of Best Fit | 9/10 |
| NME | 2/5 stars |
| Pitchfork | 3.8/10 |
| RapReviews | 7/10 |
| Rolling Stone | 3/5 stars |

Faith was met with mixed reviews from music critics, most of whom criticized the number of features on the album. At Metacritic, which assigns a normalized rating out of 100 to reviews from professional publications, the album received an average score of 53, based on nine reviews, indicating "mixed or average reviews". Aggregator AnyDecentMusic? gave it 5.6 out of 10 based on their assessment of the critical consensus.

Anthony Malone of HipHopDX saw that the album is "compiled from unfinished verses, reference tracks and soulless guest spots", and stated it is not a "Pop Smoke album – it's a symbol of greed curated for the streaming era". Rolling Stone's Mosi Reeves wrote, "Faith consists of audio files recombined by producers and record executives into something coherent, listenable, and at times even enjoyable, but not quite dazzling. Maybe it's not an Anthony Bourdain doc constructed with artificial intelligence, but it still feels a bit weird". In a lukewarm review, Alavo said, "Despite poor production choices and lazy song structures, Pop Smoke's energy and solo spurts of brilliance won't allow for this stale posthumous release to tarnish his legacy". David Crone for AllMusic felt that Faith subdues Pop Smoke, believing he "is no longer the thunderous cloud descending on his anthems; rather, he feels almost entirely an afterthought". Crone opined "with friends and collaborators surgically removed, Faith is littered with jarring voices, avaricious creative decisions, and a fundamental sidelining of its visionary figurehead". Mr. Wavvy for Cult MTL gave the album 4.5 out of 10, saying it is "clear that many of the tracks were works in progress, with guest verses slapped on to 'complete' the songs".

Kyann-Sian Williams of NME felt the album is "oversaturated with unnecessary features" and is an "obvious money grab". She continues, saying that it "feels more disingenuous" than Shoot for the Stars, Aim for the Moon. Writing for Pitchfork, Alphonse Pierre commented Faith is made up of "unfinished records, demos, and reference tracks that were sliced together and completed with features only selected to juice streaming numbers". He claims that Pop Smoke's team "leeched" money from his legacy and that the "most offensively bad [tracks] on Faith are the ones that have no shame in hiding their financial intentions". Keith Nelson Jr. of Mic asserted that Pop Smoke sounds "like a guest on his own album", characterizing it was "made more from the thoughts of the living trying to keep the dead alive". According to Noor Lobad of L'Officiel, the album boasts "repetitive hooks and exorbitant number of features", and mentions it "inadvertently turn[s] the rapper's booming voice into a muddled echo on his own album".

In a more positive review, Billboard's Jason Lipshutz felt impressed with Faith, believing it was "made with the same type of thoughtfulness and precision" as Shoot for the Stars, Aim for the Moon. Mahalingan praised the album, saying that "unlike the majority of [posthumous releases], Faith speaks to Pop Smoke's perpetuity in hip-hop's current context, serving as less of a lament of what could have been and more as a memorial for what was and still is". Murray also enjoyed the album, saying, "Faith succeeds by offering not only an elegiac portrait of Pop Smoke, but also a vision of what he could have become". A.D. Amorosi, writing for Variety, mentions that "despite being fully Frankenstein-ed from volumes of verses the rapper left behind, [the album] never feels limp or stitched together". He states the album "advanced and even bettered what the trap-and-drill-focused production team did on [Shoot for the Stars, Aim for the Moon]. Craig Jenkins for Vulture felt the album was "joyous, celebratory, and snide". He mentions it "refuses to let its somber circumstances weigh it down". Writing for The Ringer, Micah Peters opined Faith is like "Travis Scott's fashionably oversized Dior shirt—clean and nicely framed, competently executed, expensive, a little ridiculous. It exists and it's cool enough, but maybe we could've done just as well without it". Andrew Sacher of BrooklynVegan saw that "sometimes Faith feels like a genuinely touching tribute to Pop Smoke, but not always". He continues, saying it "didn't need to be 20 songs long and overstuffed with superstars, but considering Pop [Smoke's] recorded material is already finite, the good moments shouldn't be taken for granted".

=== Year-end lists ===
Entertainment Weekly called Faith one of the worst albums of 2021. Alex Suskind remarked that the "late drill star deserved better than this cobbled together LP overstuffed with questionable features (Dua Lipa, anyone?) and bad production". The staff of HipHopDX condemned the album, mentioning it has "recycled lyrics, forced guest spots and seemed to stray further from what endeared the King of Brooklyn drill to fans in the first place". They opined that even though "the smoke will never clear, it's time to let Pop Smoke's legacy rest". Evan Sawdey for Yardbarker placed Faith at number 19 on his "The Most Disappointing Albums of 2021" list, saying it "feels like a violation of his legacy". He commented that the late rapper "has very little time on his own album, pushed aside for the many guests to jump onto verse fragments [he] left behind". Sawdey concludes by saying Faith is a "prime example of how not to honor a fallen artist. Disappointing on every front". On Capital Xtra's list of "The Top 20 Best Albums of 2021", Faith was placed at number 18. Cat Warner stated the album helped keep Pop Smoke's legacy alive, and "doing so perfectly".

== Commercial performance ==
Faith debuted at number one on the US Billboard 200 chart, earning 88,000 album-equivalent units that consisted of 113.34 million on-demand streams, 4,000 pure album sales, and 1,000 track-equivalent albums. This gave the late artist his second number one album, and third top-10 hit overall in the United States. Pop Smoke became the first artist in history to have his first two albums posthumously debut at the top of the Billboard 200. Faith also topped the US Billboard Top R&B/Hip-Hop Albums and Canadian Albums Chart.

Faith debuted at number three on the UK Albums Chart, giving Pop Smoke his second top-10 hit in the United Kingdom. In Australia, the album debuted at number four, giving the late rapper his second top-10 hit in the country. The album further peaked within the top-10 of record charts in Austria, both the Belgium Flanders and Wallonia charts, Denmark, the Netherlands, Finland, France, Germany, Ireland, Italy, Lithuania, New Zealand, Norway, Sweden, and Switzerland.

== Impact ==
Upon release, Faith received mixed responses from Pop Smoke's fans. Some people praised the album and said it paid tribute to Pop Smoke, while others criticized the album and wanted the late rapper to rest in peace.

== Track listing ==
Faith track listing
| No. | Title | Lyrics | Music | Producer(s) | Length |
|---|---|---|---|---|---|
| 1. | "Good News" | Bashar Jackson; Audrey Jackson; Andre Loblack | B. Jackson; A. Jackson; Loblack | 808MeloBeats | 0:46 |
| 2. | "More Time" | B. Jackson; Steven Victor; Nicholas Britell | B. Jackson; Victor; Britell; Ricardo Lamarre; Jason Avalos | Rico Beats; Britell; L3gion^{[a]} | 2:00 |
| 3. | "Tell the Vision" (featuring Kanye West and Pusha T) | B. Jackson; Terrence LeVarr Thornton; Jahlil; FnZ; Victor | B. Jackson; Kanye Omari West; Thornton; Victor; Jahlil; Lamarre; FnZ; Ross Portaro; Jahmal Gwin | West; Jahlil; Rico Beats; FnZ; SethInTheKitchen; Boogz | 3:35 |
| 4. | "Manslaughter" (featuring Rick Ross and The-Dream) | B. Jackson; William Leonard Roberts II; Victor; Justin Kim; Darrius Willrich; Ryan Press | B. Jackson; Roberts; Victor; Kim; Willrich; Press; Daoud Anthony | Daoud; Ryan Press; Jake One; JMoney; Jess Jackson^{[b]} | 4:09 |
| 5. | "Bout a Million" (featuring 21 Savage and 42 Dugg) | B. Jackson; Shéyaa Bin Abraham-Joseph; Dion Hayes | B. Jackson; Abraham-Joseph; Hayes; Manalla Abdul-Aziz | Axl | 3:23 |
| 6. | "Brush Em" (featuring Rah Swish) | B. Jackson; Rahlique Wilks | B. Jackson; Wilks; Loblack | 808MeloBeats; J. Jackson^{[b]}; Dylan Jackson^{[b]} | 2:30 |
| 7. | "Top Shotta" (with The Neptunes, featuring Pusha T, Travi and Beam) | B. Jackson; Chad Hugo; Thornton; Tyshane Thompson | B. Jackson; Hugo; Thornton; Thompson; Pharrell L. Williams | The Neptunes | 4:19 |
| 8. | "30" (featuring Bizzy Banks) | B. Jackson; Majesty Moses; Victor | B. Jackson; Majesty Moses; Victor; Lamarre | Rico Beats | 3:48 |
| 9. | "Beat the Speaker" | B. Jackson | B. Jackson; Loblack; Brandon Sully | 808MeloBeats; Fritz tha Producer | 1:46 |
| 10. | "Coupe" | B. Jackson; Victor; Lamarre | B. Jackson; Victor; Lamarre | Rico Beats | 2:03 |
| 11. | "What's Crackin'" (featuring Takeoff) | B. Jackson; Kirshnik Ball; Victor; Lamarre | B. Jackson; Ball; Victor; Lamarre | Rico Beats | 2:57 |
| 12. | "Genius" (with Lil Tjay and Swae Lee) | B. Jackson; Tionne Merritt; Khalif Brown; Sergio Kitchens; Victor; Lamarre | B. Jackson; Merritt; K. Brown; Kitchens; Victor; Lamarre | Rico Beats; Tay Keith^{[b]} | 3:28 |
| 13. | "Mr. Jones" (featuring Future) | B. Jackson; Nayvadius Wilburn; Michael Hernandez; Carlos Goodwin; John Wesley Lucas | B. Jackson; Wilburn; Alex Petit; Hernandez; Goodwin; Lucas | CashMoneyAP; Foreign Teck; Los the Producer; JW Lucas | 3:34 |
| 14. | "Woo Baby Interlude" | B. Jackson | B. Jackson | | 0:28 |
| 15. | "Woo Baby" (featuring Chris Brown) | B. Jackson; Chris Brown; J. Jackson; Gwin; Linden Bascom | B. Jackson; C. Brown; J. Jackson; Gwin; Bascom | Boogz; 2300 | 2:36 |
| 16. | "Demeanor" (featuring Dua Lipa) | B. Jackson; Dua Lipa; Dru Decaro | B. Jackson; Lipa; DeCaro; Daniel Mizrahi; Michael Gomes | Decaro; Mantra; Gomes; J. Jackson; Corey "Cutz" Nutile^{[b]} | 3:04 |
| 17. | "Spoiled" (featuring Pharrell) | B. Jackson; Williams | B. Jackson; Williams; Hugo | The Neptunes | 1:44 |
| 18. | "8-Ball" (featuring Kid Cudi) | B. Jackson; Scott Mescudi; Tyrone Johnson | B. Jackson; Mescudi; Johnson; Kasseem Dean | Swizz Beatz; Musicman Ty; Avenue Beatz | 2:56 |
| 19. | "Back Door" (featuring Quavo and Kodak Black) | B. Jackson; Bill Kapri | B. Jackson; Kapri; Tahj Morgan; Thomas Horton; Friendlor Nomancy | Tahj Money; TNT; Kidd Fredo | 4:03 |
| 20. | "Merci Beaucoup" | B. Jackson; Williams | B. Jackson; Williams; Hugo | The Neptunes | 2:55 |
| Total length: | | | | | 56:04 |

Deluxe edition (bonus tracks)
| No. | Title | Lyrics | Music | Producer(s) | Length |
|---|---|---|---|---|---|
| 21. | "Questions" | B. Jackson | B. Jackson; Loblack | 808MeloBeats | 2:25 |
| 22. | "Run Down" (featuring OnPointLikeOP and G Herbo) | B. Jackson; Herbert Wright; Yosief Tafari | B. Jackson; Wright; Tafari; Kirston Hedge | Yoz | 3:00 |
| 23. | "Money Man" (featuring Killa) | B. Jackson; Rouben Dossous; Lamarre | B. Jackson; Dossous; Lamarre; Alyamani Ouadah | Yamaica | 2:15 |
| 24. | "Defiant" (featuring Dread Woo and Travi) | B. Jackson; Carl Dorsmind; Dread Woo; Jahkeem Haughton; Travis Esprit | B. Jackson; Dorsmind; Dread Woo; Haughton; Esprit; Loblack | Fritz tha Producer; LSP | 3:54 |
| 25. | "Rumble" (featuring Tayy Floss) | B. Jackson; Josip Planinic; Tay Floss | B. Jackson; Planinic; Floss | Joezee | 3:24 |
| 26. | "Don't Know Em" (with Rah Swish) | B. Jackson; Abdul-Aziz; Wilks | B. Jackson; Abdul-Aziz; Wilks | Axl | 1:51 |
| 27. | "Double It" (featuring Fetty Luciano) | B. Jackson; Loblack; Remy Marshall | B. Jackson; Loblack; Marshall | 808MeloBeats | 2:46 |
| 28. | "Mr. Jones" (Remix; with Anuel AA) | B. Jackson; Emmanuel Santiago; Hernandez; Goodwin; Lucas | B. Jackson; Hernandez; Goodwin; Lucas | CashMoneyAP; Foreign Teck; Los the Producer; JW Lucas | 3:49 |
| 29. | "Bad Boys" (featuring Obasi Jackson) | B. Jackson; Obasi Jackson | B. Jackson; Loblack; O. Jackson | O. Jackson | 2:42 |
| 30. | "Dior" | B. Jackson; Loblack | B. Jackson; Loblack | 808MeloBeats | 3:36 |
| Total length: | | | | | 86:02 |

Notes

- ^{^[a]} signifies a co-producer
- ^{^[b]} signifies an additional producer

== Personnel ==
Performers

- Pop Smoke – rap vocals
- 808MeloBeats – programming (1, 6, 9, 21, 27, 30)
- L3gion – keyboards (2)
- Rico Beats – programming (2, 3, 8, 11, 12, 23)
- Boogz – programming (3, 15)
- Jahlil – programming (3)
- Kanye West – programming (3)
- SethInTheKitchen – programming (3)
- Pusha T – rap vocals (3, 7)
- JMoney – programming (4)
- The-Dream – vocals (4)
- Axl – programming (5, 26)
- 21 Savage – rap vocals (5)
- 42 Dugg – rap vocals (5)
- Jess Jackson – programming (6, 16)
- Rah Swish – rap vocals (6, 26)
- The Neptunes – programming (7, 17)
- Beam – rap vocals (7)
- Travi – rap vocals (7)
- Bizzy Banks – rap vocals (8)
- Fritz Tha Producer – programming (9, 24)
- Los the Producer – background vocals, guitar, keyboards, programming (28)
- Foreign Teck – programming (13, 28)
- JW Lucas – programming (13, 28)
- Future – rap vocals (13)
- 2300 – programming (15)
- Chris Brown – vocals (15)
- Mike Gomes – background vocals (16)
- Mantra – bass, drums, guitar, keyboards, percussion (16)
- Corey "Cutz" Nutile – programming (16)
- Dua Lipa – vocals (16)
- Pharrell – vocals (17)
- Kasseem Dean – programming (18)
- Kid Cudi – rap vocals (18)
- Kidd Fredo – programming (19)
- TNT – programming (19)
- Tahj Money – programming (19)
- Yoz – programming (22)
- G Herbo – vocals (22)
- OnPointLikeOP – vocals (22)
- Killa – vocals (23)
- LSP – programming (24)
- Dread Woo – vocals (24)
- Joezee – programming (25)
- Tay Floss – rap vocals (25)
- Fetty Luciano – rap vocals (27)
- Anuel AA – vocals (28)
- Obasi Jackson – rap vocals (29)

Technical

- Jess Jackson – mastering engineer (1–26, 28–29), mixer (1–14, 16–20, 22–24, 26, 28, 29), mix engineer (2–20, 22, 25)
- Patrizio "Teezio" Pigliapoco – mixer, recording engineer (15)
- Ben Lust – mixer (21)
- Elvin Molina – mixer (27)
- Jaycen Joshua – mixer (30)
- Andrew Yanchyshyn – recording engineer (1)
- Vic Wainstein – recording engineer (2, 3, 30)
- Brandon Harding – recording engineer (4)
- Corey "Cutz" Nutile – recording engineer (4, 5, 8, 11, 12, 14–18, 20, 23, 26–27)
- Dom Martin – recording engineer (6)
- Aleksi Godard – recording engineer (7)
- James Dimino – recording engineer (10)
- DJ Durel – recording engineer (11)
- Barrington Hall – recording engineer (12)
- Randy Lanphear – recording engineer (12)
- Nate Alford – recording engineer (13, 28)
- William J. Sullivan – recording engineer (18)
- BL – recording engineer (19, 25)
- Chase Davis – recording engineer (20)
- Ryan Press – recording engineer (20)
- Tony – recording engineer (21)
- Jason Goldberg – recording engineer (22)
- LSP – recording engineer (24)
- Obasi Jackson – recording engineer (29)
- Yung Ave – recording engineer (30)
- Ciel Eckard-Lee – assistant mixer (1–20, 22–24), mix engineer (22), mixer (28)
- David Bone – assistant mixer (22–26, 28–29), mix engineer (22)
- DJ Riggins – assistant mixer (30)
- Jacob Richards – assistant mixer (30)
- Mike Seaberg – assistant mixer (30)
- Tali Zara Sulcas – assistant recording engineer (4)

== Charts ==
=== Weekly charts ===
Chart performance for Faith
| Chart (2021) | Peak position |
|---|---|
| Australian Albums (ARIA) | 4 |
| Austrian Albums (Ö3 Austria) | 4 |
| Belgian Albums (Ultratop Flanders) | 2 |
| Belgian Albums (Ultratop Wallonia) | 2 |
| Canadian Albums (Billboard) | 1 |
| Danish Albums (Hitlisten) | 2 |
| Dutch Albums (Album Top 100) | 2 |
| Finnish Albums (Suomen virallinen lista) | 8 |
| French Albums (SNEP) | 4 |
| German Albums (Offizielle Top 100) | 7 |
| Irish Albums (Official Charts) | 6 |
| Italian Albums (FIMI) | 6 |
| Lithuanian Albums (AGATA) | 9 |
| New Zealand Albums (RMNZ) | 3 |
| Norwegian Albums (VG-lista) | 2 |
| Spanish Albums (Promusicae) | 20 |
| Swedish Albums (Sverigetopplistan) | 3 |
| Swiss Albums (Schweizer Hitparade) | 3 |
| UK Albums (Official Charts) | 3 |
| UK R&B Albums (Official Charts) | 11 |
| US Billboard 200 | 1 |
| US Top R&B/Hip-Hop Albums (Billboard) | 1 |

=== Year-end charts ===
2021 year-end chart performance for Faith
| Chart (2021) | Position |
|---|---|
| Belgian Albums (Ultratop Flanders) | 176 |
| Danish Albums (Hitlisten) | 82 |
| Dutch Albums (Album Top 100) | 77 |
| Icelandic Albums (Tónlistinn) | 97 |
| Swiss Albums (Schweizer Hitparade) | 94 |
| US Billboard 200 | 167 |
| US Top R&B/Hip-Hop Albums (Billboard) | 65 |

== Certifications ==
Certifications for Faith
| Region | Certification | Certified units/sales |
|---|---|---|
| Denmark (IFPI Danmark) | Gold | 10,000^{‡} |
| France (SNEP) | Gold | 50,000^{‡} |
| New Zealand (RMNZ) | Gold | 7,500^{‡} |
| United Kingdom (BPI) | Silver | 60,000^{‡} |
^{‡} Sales+streaming figures based on certification alone.

== Release history ==
Release dates and formats for Faith
| Region | Date | Label(s) | Format(s) | Edition | Ref. |
|---|---|---|---|---|---|
| Various | July 16, 2021 | Victor Victor; Republic | Digital download; streaming | Standard | |
| Various | July 20, 2021 | Victor Victor; Republic | Digital download; streaming | Deluxe | |
| Various | July 30, 2021 | Victor Victor; Republic | Digital download; streaming | Deluxe | |
| Germany | August 13, 2021 | Victor Victor; Republic | CD | Standard | |
| Japan | August 13, 2021 | Victor Victor; Republic | CD | Standard | |
| South Korea | September 3, 2021 | Victor Victor; Republic | CD | Standard | |
| Various | September 13, 2021 | Victor Victor; Republic | CD | Standard | |
