= Coupe (song) =

2021 song by Pop Smoke

Song by Pop Smoke

from the album Faith
- Released: July 16, 2021
- Recorded: 2019–2020
- Genre: Trap
- Length: 2:03
- Label: Victor Victor; Republic
- Songwriters: Bashar Jackson; Steven Victor; Ricardo Lamarre
- Producer: Rico Beats

Music video
- "Coupe" on YouTube

"Coupe" is a song by American rapper Pop Smoke from his second posthumous studio album, Faith (2021). The song was written by Pop Smoke, Steven Victor, and Rico Beats. The track was solely produced by the latter. "Coupe" features the use of looping 808's, while the lyrics discuss the themes of celebrity excess. The song received mixed from music critics, with one of them saying Pop Smoke's vocal felt unfinished.

Commercially, the song reached number four on the US Bubbling Under Hot 100 Singles. It further charted at number 128 on the US Billboard Global 200 and number 44 on the Hot R&B/Hip-Hop Songs chart. The song was more successful outside of the United States, peaking at number 47 on the Canadian Hot 100. A music video for "Coupe" was directed by JLShotThat and filmed in Pop Smoke's hometown of Canarsie, Brooklyn. The visual sees a group of people celebrating the late rapper's birthday and legacy in a basketball court, while riding cars and bikes through the streets.

== Background and composition ==
"Coupe" was released as the tenth track on American rapper Pop Smoke's second posthumous studio album, Faith (2021). The song was written by the rapper, alongside Steven Victor and Rico Beats. The track was solely produced by the latter. Udit Mahalingan for The Line of Best Fit stated the song "encase[s] the all-too-familiar themes of celebrity excess and rampant materialism within looping 808's to hypnotic effect". For Variety, A.D. Amorosi said the track has the "mood-swinging musicality of [Pop] Smoke's vocal flow on the freestyle-centered". Pop Smoke raps "Don't run in my crib, I'll put guns to your head" before a brief pause in the music to emphasize the line's profundity.

== Reception ==
Robin Murray from Clash stated that both "Coupe" and "Beat the Speaker" are "essentially freestyles carved out into individual tracks". Writing for HipHopDX, Anthony Malone thought the Pop Smoke's vocals in the song "feel unfinished, lacking the meticulous detail and final touches that made his music dynamic". He continues, mentioning the "only saving grace is these are the few times where Pop [Smoke] isn't competing for air time with cash-grabbing features who lack chemistry with his doctored vocals". Antoine-Samuel Mauffette Alavo of Exclaim! thought the song was sounded like "classic Pop Smoke". Mahalingan described "Coupe" as a "career-defining track". Amorosi opined that the song showed "Victor's production team's dedication to broadening [Pop] Smoke's sonic and melodic palette". Keith Nelson Jr. of Mic asserted that "Coupe" was a "jarring error of judgement that hurt the creditability of the album as a true manifestation of Pop [Smoke's] intentions". "Coupe" peaked at number four on the US Bubbling Under Hot 100 Singles, while reaching number 44 on the US Hot R&B/Hip-Hop Songs and number 128 on the Billboard Global 200. The song further peaked at number 47 on the Canadian Hot 100.

== Music video ==
=== Background and synopsis ===
A music video for "Coupe" was uploaded to Pop Smoke's YouTube channel on July 21, 2021. The video was directed by JL Shot That. The visual takes place in Pop Smoke's hometown of Canarsie, Brooklyn and was primarily filmed at a basketball court in the late rappers neighborhood. Graffiti tributes of the murdered rapper appear throughout the video. People from all over Brooklyn, including Pop Smoke's mother, and fellow American rappers Bobby Shmurda, Rowdy Rebel, and Rah Swish who party and celebrate Pop Smoke's birthday and legacy. GS9 members dance by Pop Smoke and DMX's mural and pop a bottle of alcohol. The visual also shows a fleet of cars, including a white Rolls-Royce Cullinan with the word "Faith" painted on its side, McLarens, Lamborghinis, Ferraris, and people riding bikes through the streets during the climax.

=== Critical reception ===
The music video was met with positive reviews from critics. Writing for the TV network Revolt, Jon Powell stated the music video was "incredible display for an incredible individual gone too soon". Alex Zidel for HotNewHipHop opined the people of Canarsie "had a great time" during the video. Kafui Mensah of GRM Daily said the "iconic rapper pulls no punches on this fan-favorite track". She continues, saying "the Rico Beats production provid[es] the perfect atmosphere for Pop Smoke to create a lit party banger" and concludes by mentioning it came out "in true [New] [York] fashion".

== Credits and personnel ==
Credits adapted from Tidal.

- Pop Smoke – vocals, songwriter
- Steven Victor – songwriter
- Rico Beats – production, songwriter
- Jess Jackson – mastering engineer, mixing engineer, mixer
- James Dimino – recording engineer
- Ciel Eckard-Lee – assistant mixer

== Charts ==
Chart performance for "Coupe"
Chart (2021)	Peak position
Canada Hot 100 (Billboard)	47
Global 200 (Billboard)	128
US Bubbling Under Hot 100 (Billboard)	4
US Hot R&B/Hip-Hop Songs (Billboard)	44
