= Iced Out Audemars =

2020 song by Pop Smoke

- Lil Wayne remix cover

Song by Pop Smoke featuring Dafi Woo

from the album Shoot for the Stars, Aim for the Moon (Deluxe)
- Released: July 20, 2020
- Genre: Drill
- Length: 3:02
- Label: Victor Victor; Republic
- Songwriters: Bashar Jackson; Ricardo Lamarre; John Stevens; Khadafi Julio
- Producers: Rico Beats; BigBroLGND (addi.)

"Iced Out Audemars" is a song by American rapper Pop Smoke featuring fellow American rapper Dafi Woo, from the deluxe version of the former's first posthumous album and debut studio album, Shoot for the Stars, Aim for the Moon (2020). The song was written by the rappers alongside producer Rico Beats and additional producer BigBroLGND. A drill track, the lyrics see Pop Smoke and Dafi Woo celebrating over the finer things and expressing their love for Dior, among other designer jewelry.

A remix of the song that features Lil Wayne was released on October 15, 2020. For the lyrics of the remix, Lil Wayne replaces Dafi Woo and pays homage to Pop Smoke after he died in a home invasion on February 19, 2020. The remix of "Iced Out Audemars" received positive reviews from music critics, with a number of them praising Lil Wayne's verse.

== Background and release ==
"Iced Out Audemars" was released on the deluxe version of Pop Smoke's posthumous debut studio album Shoot for the Star, Aim for the Moon, as the twenty-fourth track on July 20, 2020. A snippet of a remix featuring American rapper Lil Wayne surfaced online on October 5, 2020. The remix was later released on October 15, 2020.

== Music and lyrics ==
Musically, "Iced Out Audemars" is a drill track. Jordan Darville of The Fader stated that Pop Smoke and Dafi Woo celebrate "the finer things over a beat that glitters with the exultant panache of dozens of champagne flutes being clinked together". Jessica McKinney of Complex commented that Pop Smoke is "aggressive and electric with familiar bars about Dior and other designer jewels". Lil Wayne replaces Dafi Woo on the song's remix and raps his verse during both the chorus and outro.

Lil Wayne pays homage to Pop Smoke after he was shot and killed during a home invasion: "Iced out Audemars/Wait, I told you so / Blacked out all my cars/Rest in peace to Poppy/Here today, we gone tomorrow." He further raps: "Wu-Tang bean in the cranberry cream/And the cash ruled everything around me since/Cream, got the money, whole team got the money/Hoes dream they could fuck me, codeine got me muddy." Complex writer Joe Price wrote that Lil Wayne starts "with a melodic approach before effortlessly shifting to a rapid-fire flow". McKinney said Lil Wayne "switches up his flow midway through the verse, delivering rapid-fire bars with high-pitched vocals".

== Critical reception ==
The remix of "Iced Out Audemars" was met with generally positive reviews from music critics. Alex Zidel of HotNewHipHop said that Lil Wayne brings "energy and sharp bars to the match-up" and "delivers a stand-out verse that the late [Pop Smoke] would have been proud of". McKinney opined that Lil Wayne "adds a nice contrast to the record", while Darville wrote the rapper contributes "breathless new bars". Jon Powell, for Revolt, commented that he "delivers a dope tribute" to Pop Smoke. Michael Saponara of HipHopDX deemed Lil Wayne's verse as "silky". Carl Lamarre, writing for Billboard magazine, described the song as "thunderous", and said that "New York's rap scene gets another sterling Pop Smoke track".

== Credits and personnel ==
Credits adapted from Tidal.

- Pop Smoke – vocals, songwriter
- Dafi Woo – vocals, featured artist, songwriter
- Rico Beats – production, songwriter, programming
- BigBroLGND – additional production, songwriter
- Jess Jackson – mixing engineer, mastering engineer
- Corey Nutile – engineer
- Rose Adams – additional mixing engineer
- Sage Skolfield – additional mixing engineer
- Sean Solymar – additional mixing engineer
