= Dru DeCaro =

American singer-songwriter

- Also known as: Falconry
- Born: Andrew Phillip DeCaro; Washington, D.C., U.S.
- Origin: Baltimore, Maryland, U.S.
- Genres: R&B; neo soul; rock; hip hop; funk; jazz
- Occupations: Musician; singer; songwriter; record producer
- Instruments: Guitar; vocals; keyboards
- Website: www.drudecaro.com

Dru DeCaro, know professionally as "Falconry" is an American record producer, songwriter, musical director, filmmaker and multi-instrumentalist. He is a two time Grammy nominee, a BMI Award winning songwriter, and a Da Vinci Award winning filmmaker. DeCaro has written and produced numerous platinum selling records, working with artists including Khalid, Machine Gun Kelly, Pop Smoke, Dua Lipa, Polo G, 6lack, Lucky Daye, Ty Dolla $ign, Trippie Redd, and Fletcher. He's also performed in a number of bands throughout his career, including 93PUNX with close collaborator Vic Mensa, and currently with The Audacity. He is also well known for his many years as the lead guitarist for singer Miguel and has performed with Snoop Dogg, Will.I.Am, John Legend, Ice Cube, Faith Hill, Lil Jon, Jojo, Andy Grammer, Vic Mensa, Machine Gun Kelly, Christian French, Elle Varner, Chrisette Michele, and Monomaniac.

== Early life ==
DeCaro was born in Washington, D.C. He moved to Baltimore with his parents, Teresa and Jeffrey, when he was three years old. At the age of 10, DeCaro's uncle gave him his first guitar. Assembling kids from the neighborhood, he formed a band and began writing songs and rehearsing in a friend's basement.

== Career ==
At the age of 15, while working at a local pub, he met an older drummer and entered Baltimore's rock and heavy metal scene. The resulting band, called Ex-Rate, was influenced by the metal bands of the early 2000s and east coast hip hop. They played shows around the Mid-Atlantic, sharing the bill with The Strokes, Good Charlotte, and Pissing Razors, and recording an EP at Omega Studios. Maintaining his connection with Matt Long, DeCaro sought his assistance once again in the formation of his subsequent musical ensemble To a Science. This was a four-member, progressive rock band with DeCaro retaining his role as the chief songwriter and de facto leader of the group as they created their sole EP Why Stop Now.

At the age of 20, DeCaro moved to Los Angeles and studied jazz guitar at Cal State University, Northridge. He landed a job bartending at the Viper Room and soon began booking shows and performing weekly there. It was on the Viper Room's stage that he first played with Erykah Badu at an impromptu jam session, which ultimately set him off on a course of RnB, soul, and urban music.

He met DJ Skee and became Skee's house guitarist, later playing, recording, and producing for Snoop Dogg, The Game, Ice Cube, and others. He then led a 10-piece band and hosted a weekly jam at the nearby House of Blues, doing so for two years until he started touring heavily.

In 2009, DeCaro met Miguel at a show at The Roxy in West Hollywood, which began a partnership spanning close to a decade and three album cycles, multiple grammy nominations, and tours all over the world. In 2017, he began working closely with Vic Mensa, starting a punk band together called 93PUNX, releasing multiple albums and touring globally, including opening for Jay-Z.

By the end of 2020, DeCaro's career as a full time songwriter and producer was taking off. He produced songs like all i know with Machine Gun Kelly and Trippie Redd on breakout album Tickets To My Downfall and continued the momentum with 2021 releases like Demeanor with Pop Smoke and Dua Lipa, Retrograde with Khalid, 6lack, and Lucky Daye, and SHELTER with Vic Mensa, Wyclef Jean, and Chance the Rapper. DeCaro's release slate in 2022 included Em Beihold's breakout, platinum single "Numb Little Bug" that went #1 at Hot AC, #5 at Top 40 Radio, earning him a BMI award. Other releases that year included Fletcher's single Becky's So Hot and One Ok Rock's album Luxury Disease, which he co-executive produced with Rob Cavallo and included collaborations with artists like Teddy Swims.

Since 2023, DeCaro played a similar role in One Ok Rock's 2025 album Detox, co-written and produced a number of songs with close collaborator Whethan, including his RIAA gold single Money on the Dash with Elley Duhe, and produced songs for artists ranging from Polo G and Flowdan to Jackson Wang and Pierce the Veil.

DeCaro also continues to play live, often with emerging artists he produces for, including Royal & The Serpent on Avril Lavigne's tour and CIL on Stevie Nicks' tour over the last couple years.

He also produced his first short film Destination Angels in 2021, featuring the folk artist Fences creating a new album to honor the memory of his biggest inspiration Jack Kerouac. The film was created in conjunction with Jack Kerouac's estate, featured at the centennial celebration of Kerouac's birthday, and has won a number of awards at film festivals across the world, including the Beverly Hills Film Festival and Cannes.

Beyond traditional music pursuits as a writer and producer, DeCaro is also the co-writer, composer, creator, and director of a musical called Bloodlove.

== Selected discography ==
Year	Song(s)	Album	Artist	Details
2024	Dying In Your Hands	Non-album single	The Audacity	Songwriter
2024	"Waterfall"	Entry Wounds	The Audacity	Songwriter, producer
2024	"Crawling Over Glass"	Entry Wounds	The Audacity	Songwriter, producer
2024	Punch The Brakes	Non-album single	Chrsitian French	Songwriter, producer
2024	Earn Your Love	Non-album single	Aijia Grammer	Songwriter, producer
2023	"Go Ghost"	Magic Man	Jackson Wang	Songwriter, producer
2022	Trainwreck	Non-album single	Kailee Morgue	Songwriter, producer
2021	Demeanor	Faith	Dua Lipa, Pop Smoke	Songwriter, producer
2020	paper thin	good things take time	Christian French	Songwriter, producer
2019	I think too much	good things take time	Christian French	Songwriter, producer
2019	Play Nice	Non album single	Jules LeBlanc	Songwriter, producer
