= Woo Baby =

Single by Pop Smoke featuring Chris Brown

from the album Faith
- Released: July 22, 2021
- Genre: R&B; trap
- Length: 2:36
- Label: Victor Victor; Republic
- Songwriters: Bashar Jackson; Christopher Brown; Jess Jackson; Steven Victor; Shaffer Smith; Mikkel Eriksen; Tor Hermansen; Jahmal Gwin; Brittany Coney; Denisa Andrews; Linden Bascom; Ryan Press
- Producers: Boogz; 2300; Jess Jackson (addi.)

Pop Smoke singles chronology
"Demeanor" (2021)	"Woo Baby" (2021)	"Bad Boys" (2021)

Chris Brown singles chronology
"Angles" (2021)	"Woo Baby" (2021)	"Nostálgico" (2021)

Audio video
- "Woo Baby" on YouTube

"Woo Baby" is a song by American rapper Pop Smoke featuring American singer Chris Brown, from the former's posthumous second studio album, Faith (2021). The song was written by the two artists alongside Steven Victor, Brittany "Chi" Coney, Denisia "Blu June” Andrews, Linden Bascom, Ryan Press, and producers BoogzDaBeast (Boogz), 2300, and Jess Jackson, with additional writing credits going to Ne-Yo and Stargate for the sampling of the former's "So Sick".

The song was released to rhythmic contemporary formats in the United States on July 22, 2021, as the third single from the album. Musically, "Woo Baby" is an R&B track that uses trap production. Commercially, it reached number 64 on the US Billboard Hot 100 and number 49 on the Billboard Global 200. The song did better outside of Pop Smoke's native United States, peaking within the top 25 of record charts in New Zealand and Australia.

== Background and release ==
On July 15, 2021, Pop Smoke's manager Haitian-American record executive Steven Victor revealed Faith's track list via his Instagram that included the song with a feature from American R&B singer Chris Brown. Pop Smoke's second posthumous studio album Faith was released via Victor Victor Worldwide and Republic Records on July 16, 2021, with "Woo Baby" as the fifteenth track on Faith. "Woo Baby" impacted American rhythmic contemporary radio as the album's third on July 22, 2021.

== Writing and composition ==
"Woo Baby" was written by Pop Smoke and Brown alongside Victor, Jess Jackson, Ne-Yo, Mikkel Eriksen, Tor Hermansen, Brittany "Chi" Coney, Denisia "Blu June" Andrews, BoogzDaBeast under the moniker of Boogz, Linden Bascom, and Ryan Press. It was produced by Boogz and 2300, with additional production from Jackson. Musically, "Woo Baby" is an R&B song that uses trap production. The track uses an uncredited sample of American singer-songwriter Ne-Yo's 2005 number one hit single "So Sick".

== Reception ==
A.D. Amorosi, writing for Variety, described "Woo Baby" as a "dusky R&B duet". Preezy Brown of Vibe magazine saw the song as a "bedroom romper" and mentioned that the "collaborative effort with Chris Brown proves [it]". Writing for The Ringer, Micah Peters called Brown's feature on the song "unwelcome[d]". In a negative review, Alphonse Pierre for Pitchfork mentioned he "[felt] dirty" while listening to "Woo Baby" and stated it was "obviously made to fill the radio airwaves with white noise". Keith Nelson Jr. and Austin Williams for Vibe placed the song at number two on their list of "21 Songs That Were Probably Snubbed From Those Other Year-End Lists". Both authors stated that Brown "carries his end of this duet so deftly", and mentioned the song "contains the very best of Pop Smoke's artistry. And out of respect for said artistry, this should probably be the last the world hears of it". In January 2022, "Woo Baby" was ranked at number 61 on Tinder Australia's "Top 100 Dating Anthems" list, which was based on the most popular songs on Australian Tinder profiles throughout 2021.

Following the release of Faith, "Woo Baby" debuted and peaked at number 64 on the US Billboard Hot 100 and number 49 on the Billboard Global 200. It further peaked at number 22 on the Billboard Hot R&B/Hip-Hop Songs chart. After "Woo Baby" was released as a single, it peaked at number four on the Billboard airplay Rhythmic chart, giving Pop Smoke his fifth and Brown his 47th top-10 hit on the chart, respectively. In the UK Singles Chart, the song debuted and peaked at number 54, becoming Pop Smoke's 13th and Brown's 53rd top 75 hit in the United Kingdom, respectively. Additionally, the song reached number 22 in New Zealand, number 24 in Australia, number 31 in Canada, number 41 in Switzerland, number 58 in the Netherlands, number 81 in Italy, number 95 in France, and number 105 in Portugal.

== Credits and personnel ==
Credits adapted from Tidal.

- Pop Smoke – vocals, songwriter
- Chris Brown – vocals, songwriter
- Boogz – production, programming, songwriter, associated performer
- 2300 – production, programming, associated performer
- Jess Jackson – additional production, mastering engineer, mixing engineer, songwriter
- Steven Victor – songwriter
- Ne-Yo – songwriter
- Mikkel Eriksen – songwriter
- Tor Hermansen – songwriter
- Brittany "Chi" Coney – songwriter
- Denisia "Blu June" Andrews – songwriter
- Linden Bascom – songwriter
- Ryan Press – songwriter
- Patrizio "Teezio" Pigliapoco – recording engineer, mixing
- Corey "Cutz" Nutile – recording engineer
- Ciel Eckard-Lee – assistant mixer
- David Bone – assistant mixer

== Charts ==
=== Weekly charts ===
Chart performance for "Woo Baby"
Chart (2021)	Peak position
Australia (ARIA)	24
Canada Hot 100 (Billboard)	31
France (SNEP)	95
Global 200 (Billboard)	49
Greece International (IFPI)	47
Italy (FIMI)	81
New Zealand (Recorded Music NZ)	22
Netherlands (Single Top 100)	58
Portugal (AFP)	105
Switzerland (Schweizer Hitparade)	41
UK Singles (Official Charts)	54
UK Hip Hop/R&B (Official Charts)	3
US Billboard Hot 100	64
US Hot R&B/Hip-Hop Songs (Billboard)	22
US R&B/Hip-Hop Airplay (Billboard)	14
US Rhythmic Airplay (Billboard)	4

=== Year-end charts ===
2021 year-end chart positions for "Woo Baby"
Chart (2021)	Position
US Rhythmic (Billboard)	34

== Certifications ==
Region	Certification	Certified units/sales
New Zealand (RMNZ)	Platinum	30,000^{‡}
United Kingdom (BPI)	Silver	200,000^{‡}
^{‡} Sales+streaming figures based on certification alone.

== Release history ==
Release dates and formats for "Woo Baby"
Region	Date	Format(s)	Label(s)	Ref.
United States	July 22, 2021	Rhythmic contemporary radio	Victor Victor; Republic	
