= Reyanna Maria =

Filipino-Australian singer, rapper and songwriter from Melbourne

- Born: Reyanna Maria Cuevas; 3 June 2001 (age 24); Melbourne, Victoria, Australia
- Genres: Pop; R&B; hip hop; trap
- Occupations: Singer; rapper; songwriter
- Instrument: Vocals
- Years active: 2015–present
- Labels: Victor Victor; Republic
- Website: reyannamaria.com

Reyanna Maria Cuevas (born 3 June 2001), is a Filipino-Australian singer, rapper, and songwriter. She is best known for her 2021 single, "So Pretty", and its remix featuring American rapper Tyga.

== Career ==
After covering some of her favorite artists for some time and gaining a large following on the Chinese social media platform TikTok, Maria shared her first track So Pretty in 2021 for a TikTok duet challenge. The sound clip eventually caught major traction on the platform, garnering more than 20 million views with over a million users using the clip for the challenge, including the likes of James Charles, Alicia Keys, and Chrissy Teigen. American rapper Tyga sent the clip to record executive Steven Victor, who signed Reyanna to his record label Victor Victor Worldwide and Republic Records. Maria later released the remix of her track featuring Tyga. She is reportedly working on her debut EP.
