= Mr. Jones (Pop Smoke song) =

2021 song by Pop Smoke featuring Future

Single by Pop Smoke featuring Future

from the album Faith
- Released: July 16, 2021
- Recorded: 2019
- Genre: Trap
- Length: 3:34
- Label: Victor Victor; Republic
- Songwriters: Bashar Jackson; Nayvadius Wilburn; Alex Petit; Michael Hernandez; Carlos Goodwin; John Wesley Lucas
- Producers: CashMoneyAP; Foreign Teck; Los the Producer; JW Lucas

Pop Smoke singles chronology
"AP" (2021)	"Mr. Jones" (2021)	"Demeanor" (2021)

Future singles chronology
"Picasso" (2021)	"Mr. Jones" (2021)	"#CrossMe" (2021)

Music video
- "Mr. Jones" on YouTube

"Mr. Jones" is a song by American rapper Pop Smoke featuring fellow American rapper Future from the former's second posthumous studio album, Faith (2021). It was released as the album's lead single the same day as the album's release. The song was written by the artists alongside producers CashMoneyAP, Foreign Teck, Los the Producer, and JW Lucas,. In the lyrics, Pop Smoke and Future rap about their lavish lifestyles.

Commercially, the song reached number 71 on the US Billboard Hot 100 and number 70 on the Billboard Global 200. It also peaked at number 49 on the Canadian Hot 100. A remix of "Mr. Jones" that includes Puerto Rican rapper Anuel AA was released on the deluxe version of the album on July 30, 2021. A music video for the song was directed by HidJi and features Pop Smoke doing several activities at the Mr. Jones nightclub in Miami, Florida. It also shows interspersed footage of Future hanging out with women while at a bar.

== Background and composition ==
A leaked version of American rapper Pop Smoke's song "Mr. Jones" was recorded in 2019 and later resurfaced online in 2021. The 2019 version did not feature American rapper Future, as he later added vocals after Pop Smoke died. "Mr. Jones" was released as the lead single the same day as Pop Smoke's second posthumous studio album, Faith (2021). It was also released as the thirteenth track on the album. A remix of "Mr. Jones" that includes Puerto Rican rapper Anuel AA was released on the deluxe version of the album on July 30, 2021.

The song was written by Pop Smoke and Future alongside CashMoneyAP, Foreign Teck, Los the Producer, JW Lucas while the production was handled CashMoneyAP, Foreign Teck, Los the Producer, JW Lucas. According to Jon Powell of Revolt, Pop Smoke and Future rap about "their rockstar lifestyles". Mitch Findlay for HotNewHipHop stated the song's "mysterious beat adds an alluring layer of mystique; not menacing, but vaguely melancholic". He continued, saying both "rappers know exactly how to plan their approach, with Pop [Smoke] and Future alike delivering laid-back but fluid reflections on high-life hedonism".

== Reception ==
Robin Murray from Clash said Future "dominates on 'Mr. Jones', and his voice seems to bring out fresh nuance in Pop [Smoke's] punchy tones". Writing for Variety, A.D. Amorosi called the track "brusque", and perceived that Future "sounds as if he's pushing [Pop] Smoke to rap out in his most menacing aggressive tones". Findlay opined "Mr. Jones" is an "easy standout for those looking to kick back and catch a vibe. Pop Smoke and Future sound like kindred spirits on wax, sharing interests as well as cadential similarities". "Mr. Jones" peaked at number 71 on the US Billboard Hot 100, while reaching number 26 on the US Hot R&B/Hip-Hop Songs and number 70 on the Billboard Global 200. The song further peaked at number 49 on the Canadian Hot 100.

== Music video ==
=== Background and synopsis ===
A music video for Mr. Jones was released the same day as the song release. It was directed by AWGE's HidJi. The visual features stock and archival footage of Pop Smoke at the Mr. Jones nightclub in Miami, Florida, performing on stage, hanging out with his friends and family, popping bottles of alcohol, and being surrounded by women. The video also features interspersed footage of Future hanging out with a plethora women, sitting on a pink couch with a model and a masked friend next to him, hanging out in a bar, doing a live performance, and visiting a strip club. As the visual comes to an end, it cuts to a car driving down a highway as the sun sets while a woman wearing angel wings sits outside the car window.

=== Critical reception ===
The music video was met with positive reviews from critics. Writing for HotNewHipHop, Aron A. stated the visual was "visual treatment" for the song. Paul Duong for Rap Radar said the video was a "vibrant visual full of eye-candy". HipHopWired opined the visual kept his memory alive.

== Credits and personnel ==
Credits adapted from Tidal.

- Pop Smoke – vocals, songwriter
- Future – vocals, songwriter
- CashMoneyAP – production, songwriter, background vocalist, guitar, keyboards
- Los the Producer – production, songwriter
- JW Lucas – production, programming, songwriter
- Foreign Teck – production, programming, songwriter
- Jess Jackson – mastering engineer, mixing engineer, mixer
- Nate Alford – recording engineer
- Ciel Eckard-Lee – assistant mixer

== Charts ==
Chart performance for "Mr. Jones"
Chart (2021)	Peak position
Canada Hot 100 (Billboard)	49
Global 200 (Billboard)	70
US Billboard Hot 100	71
US Hot R&B/Hip-Hop Songs (Billboard)	26
