= Demeanor (song) =

2021 single by Pop Smoke featuring Dua Lipa

Single by Pop Smoke featuring Dua Lipa

from the album Faith
- Released: July 20, 2021
- Studio: Quad (New York City)
- Genre: Disco-pop; electropop
- Length: 3:04
- Label: Victor Victor; Republic
- Songwriters: Bashar Jackson; Dua Lipa; Daniel Mlzrahi; Michael Gomes; Dru Decaro; Sarah Hudson; Stefan Johnson; Jordan Johnson
- Producer: Mantra

Pop Smoke singles chronology
| "Mr. Jones" (2021) | "Demeanor" (2021) | "Woo Baby" (2021) |

Dua Lipa singles chronology
| "Love Again" (2021) | "Demeanor" (2021) | "Cold Heart (Pnau remix)" (2021) |

"Demeanor" is a song by American rapper Pop Smoke, featuring English singer Dua Lipa, from the former's posthumous second studio album, Faith (2021). The song was written by the two artists alongside Daniel Mlzrahi, Michael Gomes, Dru Decaro, Sarah Hudson, and Coffee, while the production was handled by Mantra. It was released to rhythmic contemporary and contemporary hit radio formats in the United States on July 20, 2021, as the second single from the album. A disco-pop and electropop track, it features a rhythm guitar, bassline, drums, funky groove, and bounce, alongside rhythmic verses.

On "Demeanor", Pop Smoke discusses suffering from poverty, while mentioning how women like how he acts and being heavily intoxicated. Lipa pays tribute to him in her verse. Several music critics criticized the lyrics and thought the song was not something Pop Smoke would make. Commercially, it reached number 86 on the US Billboard Hot 100 and number 62 on the Billboard Global 200. Outside of the United States, the song peaked within the top 50 of charts in Australia, Canada, Ireland, Sweden, and the United Kingdom.

A Nabil Elderkin-directed music video for "Demeanor" was released on July 29, 2021. The video features Pop Smoke as a ghost and being seen on a painting that comes to life and depicts different versions of him, as well as showing white doves flying around. Lipa wears a vintage corset-style lace-trimmed ballgown from Jean Paul Gaultier's Spring 1998 couture collection, which was inspired by Marie Antoinette and the Age of Enlightenment, as she does different activities and dances throughout. Several critics complimented its theme and production.

== Background and release ==
On July 9, 2021, Dua Lipa teased a collaboration with Pop Smoke by posting a video on social media of the rapper listening to her 2018 single "One Kiss". The video was accompanied with the caption "You can't say Pop without Smoke" in all caps, along with specifying the album's release date. The track listing for Faith was later revealed on July 15, 2021, confirming Lipa's feature on the song. The lyrics and composition were written by Pop Smoke and Lipa alongside Dru Decaro, Sarah Hudson, and Coffee with Daniel Mlzrahi and Michael Gomes also credited as composers. The production was handled by Mantra. Recording took place at Quad Recording Studios in New York City by Corey "Cutz" Nutile. The song was mixed by Jess Jackson, who also handled the mastering with Ciel Eckard-Lee and David Bone; both duties were done at London Town Studios in Los Angeles.

Pop Smoke's second posthumous studio album Faith was released via Victor Victor Worldwide and Republic Records on July 16, 2021, with "Demeanor" as the sixteenth track on Faith. The song impacted rhythmic contemporary and contemporary hit radio in the United States on July 20, 2021, as the album's second single. It also sent for radio airplay in Italy on July 23, 2021.

== Music and lyrics ==
"Demeanor"
A disco-pop and electropop song set to a bassline, "Demeanor" features Pop Smoke singing about how women enjoy the way he acts and being heavily intoxicated.

Musically, "Demeanor" is a disco-pop and electropop song. The track features a rhythm guitar, bassline, drums, funky groove, and bounce, accompanied by "woozy" vibes, and rhythmic verses. It contains a spliced-in verse from an unreleased Pop Smoke track called "Face2Face". Writing for The Ringer, Micah Peters opined the song is about "popping Perc 30s and shooting people". Mankaprr Conteh for Rolling Stone said Pop Smoke raps about "asserting a will not only to survive, but to thrive".

On the song, Pop Smoke sings about his "baba treesha", which is Brooklyn slang for a promiscuous woman. In connection with the slang, the rapper sings about how women like how he acts, and being heavily intoxicated. The late rapper then raps about suffering through poverty: "Look, eleven dollars a hour ain't enough to live/So I'ma go in every store and I'ma swipe this shit/They tryna lock a nigga up and I'm like, 'Fuck a pig'/'Cause either way, mommy still gon' love her kid." Lipa has her own verse, as she sings: "You can't say Pop without Smoke/So fill up your lungs, my diamonds'll make you choke/You like the way I move/My demeanor is meaner than yours/So clap for the encore", referring to Pop Smoke's line "You cannot say Pop and forget the Smoke" in his 2019 song "Gatti" with JackBoys and Travis Scott.

== Critical reception ==
David Crone of AllMusic said even though Lipa is "ostensibly at home on the slick grooves of 'Demeanor'", she "stumbles out" during the couplet: "You can't say Pop without Smoke/So fill up your lungs, my diamonds will make you choke", and described it as "excruciating". Robin Murray from Clash stated the song "shows the potential Pop [Smoke] had to cross over", but called it one of the weaker tracks on the album. For Exclaim!, Antoine-Samuel Mauffette Alavo viewed "Demeanor" as an "improbable duet" and thought Pop Smoke's fans will "undoubtedly be frustrated". In HipHopDX, Anthony Malone called the song "jarring", and stated that at worst, "it sounds like a bad DJ Khaled crossover and at best, a summertime Calvin Harris record but never a Pop Smoke song by any stretch of the imagination". Keith Nelson Jr. of Mic saw the song is a "clear attempt at expanding Pop [Smoke's] star beyond the streets and into the pop realm, but his dungeon dark vocals over drums soft enough to make Maroon 5 sound like Metallica garner mixed results".

Kyann-Sian Williams, for NME, thought the track is "underdeveloped and slight, the singer's delivery disjointed". She opined that with a "few more tweaks, it might have been worth releasing". Alphonse Pierre for Pitchfork described the track as the "most confusing record" on Faith. He mentioned the song has "a short Pop [Smoke] verse and rough hook [that] are laid over the type of bubbly production that could backdrop an episode of Gossip Girl". Pierre concluded by saying it does not "work and feel out of line with Pop [Smoke's] music—he never had to sacrifice his drill sound or intensity to make a hit". For Variety, A. D. Amorosi viewed the song as a "dud". Thomas Stremfel of Spectrum Culture declared the song's "placement over a Future Nostalgia B-side topped off with Dua Lipa's 'female alpha' persona makes for one of the worst Frankensteins of a song all year". Mr. Wavvy for Cult MTL claimed "Demeanor" was "in fact quite the misdemeanor". He ruled that it is a "mess of a mashup, essentially throwing some sped up, unreleased lines from the rapper over an otherwise great Dua [Lipa] track".

In a more positive review, Jordan Rose of Complex said Lipa "laces the song with brilliant vocals and a strong verse". In Rolling Stone, Mosi Reeves called the song "sleazy" and said it is one of the album's more impressive tracks. Peters said the song "goes down surprisingly smooth", while Steve Juon for RapReviews was surprised by Lipa's appearance. The Wall Street Journal's Natalia Barr viewed the song as a "smoky club track". Udit Mahalingan for The Line of Best Fit mentioned "Demeanor" seems "precursory to the retro-inflected sonic landscape of pop radio at present". Preezy Brown of Vibe magazine perceived the track as an "addictive salvo".

=== Accolades ===
Rolling Stone ranked "Demeanor" at number 45 on their "The 50 Best Songs of 2021" list. Mosi Reeves described the song as a "fun track that evokes the kind of mainstream superstardom [Pop Smoke] should have lived to enjoy".

== Commercial performance ==
Following the release of Faith, "Demeanor" debuted and peaked at number 86 on the US Billboard Hot 100. The song also peaked at number 19 on the US Rhythmic chart, number 35 on the Hot R&B/Hip-Hop Songs chart, number 28 on the Mainstream Top 40, and number 62 on the Billboard Global 200. In the United Kingdom, the song debuted at number 14, becoming Pop Smoke's eighth and Lipa's 19th top 40 hit in the UK, respectively. Additionally, the song reached number 20 in Ireland, number 26 in Canada, number 41 in Sweden, number 43 in Australia, number 63 in Switzerland, and number 94 in Lithuania.

== Music video ==
=== Background ===
The music video for "Demeanor" was directed by Australian-American director Nabil Elderkin. A day before the video's release, Lipa posted a preview clip on her Instagram account. While announcing the release of the video on the platform, Lipa thanked Pop Smoke's team and family for allowing her to appear on the single. The video was released to YouTube on July 29, 2021.

=== Analysis and synopsis ===
Pop Smoke is seen on a painting that comes to life and depicts different versions of him as white doves fly around.

The music video for "Demeanor" is set in the 19th century. Being inspired by Marie Antoinette and the Age of Enlightenment, Lipa wears a vintage corset-style lace-trimmed ballgown with a metallic bodice and ivory full skirt from Jean Paul Gaultier's Spring 1998 couture collection, with drop earrings, emerald pendant necklace, and a Vram ring. Lipa's outfit was created by Lorenzo Posocco. The singer's hairstylist and global creative director of Color Wow Hair Chris Appleton decided to add two bows made of real hair on the crown of her head, while her makeup artist Mary Phillips gave her sultry lids and rose-colored lipstick.

The visual begins with Lipa sitting at a dressing table, applying makeup as a lady whispers to her. It then transitions to a large castle (Neuschwanstein Castle)overlooking a red sunset and goes toward the window of a great hall, showing an expensive feast. People wear powdered wigs, Rococo and Baroque petticoats, and ruffled sleeves and collars, with them being seen dancing, drinking, and feeding each other grapes. Pop Smoke appears on a medieval tableau, with the painting coming to life. The painting depicts different versions of the late rapper, including him as a Roman emperor. He is also seen with white doves flying around him. Claire Shaffer for Rolling Stone stated the painting mimics Italian artist Leonardo da Vinci's The Last Supper.

Pop Smoke is later seen as a bright blue ghost sitting in an ornate chair at the top of a table, rapping his verse as a white dove is seen next to him. A young child looks at the deceased rapper in amazement. The visual cuts to Lipa, who is seen descending a spiral staircase and cutting through the crowd of people. She takes part in the festivities, including performing several choreographed dance routines with different partners on the floor. The singer then raises a glass with the guests to give a toast and all provide an encore. As the visual comes to an end, the camera goes back to the painting as the music fades in as a concluding tribute to Pop Smoke.

=== Critical reception ===
The staff of Rap-Up viewed the video as "fairytale-themed", while Jamie Samhan for Entertainment Tonight Canada labeled it as "medieval themed". For Allure, Sara Miranda thought the bows worn by Lipa are "the standouts". Both Kelsey Stiegman of Seventeen and Rebecca Cope of Tatler noted Lipa was paying homage to the American television series Bridgerton. Maria Bobila of Nylon stated the singer channeled royalcore. For Vulture, Justin Curto said Lipa stole the "show [by crashing] the party in a shimmering dress". Sarah Kearns for Hypebeast noted the video has "high-production". HipHopDX writer Michael Saponara opined the song "has been brought to life with a royal visual". Erica Gonzales for Harper's Bazaar mentioned it as an "over-the-top visual". W ranked Lipa's outfit as one of the best celebrity vintage fashion moments of 2021.

== Personnel ==
- Pop Smoke – vocals
- Dua Lipa – vocals
- Michael Gomes – co-production, backing vocals
- Dru Decaro – co-production
- Mantra – production, bass, drums, guitar, keyboards, percussion
- R&S – co-production
- Corey "Cutz" Nutile – additional production, programming, recording
- Jess Jackson – mixing, mastering, programming
- Ciel Eckard-Lee – assistant mixing, mastering
- David Bone – assistant mixing, mastering

== Charts ==
Chart performance for "Demeanor"
| Chart (2021) | Peak position |
|---|---|
| Australia (ARIA) | 43 |
| Canada Hot 100 (Billboard) | 26 |
| Canada CHR/Top 40 (Billboard) | 31 |
| France (SNEP) | 131 |
| Global 200 (Billboard) | 62 |
| Greece International (IFPI) | 27 |
| Ireland (IRMA) | 20 |
| Lithuania (AGATA) | 94 |
| New Zealand Hot Singles (Recorded Music NZ) | 2 |
| Portugal (AFP) | 112 |
| Sweden (Sverigetopplistan) | 41 |
| Switzerland (Schweizer Hitparade) | 63 |
| UK Singles (Official Charts) | 14 |
| UK Hip Hop/R&B (Official Charts) | 4 |
| US Billboard Hot 100 | 86 |
| US Hot R&B/Hip-Hop Songs (Billboard) | 35 |
| US Pop Airplay (Billboard) | 28 |
| US Rhythmic Airplay (Billboard) | 19 |

== Release history ==
Release dates and formats for "Demeanor"
| Region | Date | Format | Label(s) | Ref. |
|---|---|---|---|---|
| United States | July 20, 2021 | Contemporary hit radio | Victor Victor; Republic | |
| United States | July 20, 2021 | Rhythmic contemporary | Victor Victor; Republic | |
| Italy | July 23, 2021 | Radio airplay | Universal | |
