= Bizzy Banks =

American rapper

- Born: Majesty Blessed Moses; October 24, 1998 (age 27); Brooklyn, New York, U.S.
- Genres: Hip Hop; Brooklyn drill
- Occupations: Rapper; songwriter
- Years active: 2019–present

Majesty Blessed Moses (born October 24, 1998), known professionally as Bizzy Banks, is an American rapper born and raised in Brooklyn. He is best known for the remix of "30" with Pop Smoke, from his second studio album Faith, which peaked at number 97 on the Billboard Hot 100.

== Early life ==
Majesty Blessed Moses was born October 24, 1998 , in Brooklyn, New York City. He was born into a Trinidadian-American home. Growing up Moses listened to reggae music by Sizzla, Capleton, Bob Marley and Damian Marley, he wasn't introduced to rap music until his older brother introduced him to Lil Wayne. Moses grew up as a vegetarian. Moses states his brother is his biggest inspiration for making music. In an interview with DJ Booth in 2020, Moses stated "My older brother and my father going to jail when I was younger, it just made me become older at a young age because those two were the only two males in the house really...It was [just] me and my mom after a while. So, after that, I had to get on my gritty shit. Growing up where I’m from, you can’t slack in no way possible. I had to look at life differently."

== Music career ==
Moses released his debut single "Structure (Waka RMX)" on June 24, 2019, he would then release another 8 tracks that year, including his breakout single "Don't Start". On September 4, 2020, Moses would release his debut mixtape "GMTO Vol.1 (Get Money Take Over)" via Atlantic Records. The mixtape featured a sole guest appearance from Leeky G Bando. Moses would then release his second mixtape "Same Energy" on July 23, 2021. The mixtape featured appearances from Leeky G Bando and PnB Rock. Moses would feature on Pop Smoke's second posthumous album Faith, on a remix to his own song "30" (originally released in 2019). The song charted number 97 on the Billboard Hot 100, 39 on the Hot R&B/Hip-Hop Songs Chart and 48 on the Canadian Hot 100. Moses went on to release his third mixtape "GMTO Vol.2 (Get Money Take Over)" on March 8, 2024. The mixtape featured guest appearances from Leeky G Bando, ChaseTheMoney, Kenzo B, Luh Tyler and Shawny Binladen. On June 27, 2025, Moses would release his fourth mixtape J4TS (Just 4 The Summer). The mixtape featured appearances from Chow Lee, Stunna Gambino and Shawny Binladen.

Moses has been regarded as one of the innovators of Brooklyn Drill.

== Legal issues ==
On January 7, 2022, Moses was arrested for drug, weapons and money laundering during a SWAT raid in Hackensack, New Jersey. Moses was found with two pounds of marijuana, $2,750 and a firearm loaded with hollow point bullets. Moses was given seven charges from the raid including Unlawful Possession of a Weapon-Handguns Without Permit, Distributing/Possessing/Possession With Intent to Deliver Drug Paraphernalia, Money Laundering-Transporting/Possessing Criminal Property, Possession of a Weapon for Unlawful Purpose-Firearm-Anyone among others.

== Personal life ==
Moses has a daughter.

== Discography ==
=== Mixtapes ===
Title	Details
GMTO Vol.1 (Get Money Take Over)	Released: September 4, 2020; Labels: Atlantic Records; Format: digital download, streaming
Same Energy	Released: July 23, 2021; Labels: Atlantic Records; Format: digital download, streaming
GMTO Vol.2 (Get Money Take Over)	Released: March 8, 2024; Labels: Atlantic Records; Format: digital download, streaming
J4TS	Released: June 27, 2025; Labels: GMTO; Format: digital download, streaming

=== Extended Plays ===
Title	Details
Same Ole Bizzy	Released: December 14, 2022; Labels: Warner Music Group, X5 Music Group; Format: digital download, streaming
Hip Hop At Fifty: Bizzy Banks	Released: August 11, 2023; Labels: Warner Music Group, X5 Music Group; Format: digital download, streaming

=== Singles ===
==== As lead artist ====
List of singles as a lead artist, with selected chart positions, showing year released and album name
Title	Year	Peak chart positions	Album
Title	Year	US	Album
"Structure (Waka RMX)"	2019	—	Non-album singles
"Meet The Structure"	2019	—	Non-album singles
"Don't Start"	2019	—	Non-album singles
"Pop Out"	2019	—	Non-album singles
"Underrated"	2019	—	Non-album singles
"Victim"	2019	—	Non-album singles
"2Pac"	2019	—	Non-album singles
"30"	2019	—	Non-album singles
"Ready or Not"	2019	—	Non-album singles
"Saucing"	2020	—	Non-album singles
"Hate Me"	2020	—	Non-album singles
"Structure Gang Freestyle"	2020	—	Non-album singles
"Quarantine Freestyle"	2020	—	GMTO Vol.1
"Don't Start Pt.2"	2020	—	GMTO Vol.1
"Movies"	2020	—	GMTO Vol.1
"Extra Sturdy"	2020	—	GMTO Vol.1
"Bandemic"	2021	—	Same Energy
"City Hot"	2021	—	Same Energy
"Adore You" (featuring PnB Rock)	2021	—	Same Energy
"My Shit"	2021	—	Same Energy
"Don't Know How To Act"	2022	—	Non-album singles
"I Can't"	2022	—	Non-album singles
"No Passes"	2022	—	Same Ole Bizzy
"2016"	2022	—	Same Ole Bizzy
"Ok Ok Ok"	2023	—	GMTO Vol. 2
"Feelings"	2023	—	Non-album singles
"100k Large" (with Clay Frazer)	2023	—	Non-album singles
"On Lock"	2024	—	GMTO Vol.2
"Obama"	2024	—	GMTO Vol.2
"Don't Start Pt.3"	2024	—	GMTO Vol.2
"Hottie" (with Taze and C1)	2024	—	Non-album singles
"Back In The Mix"	2024	—	Non-album singles
"No Limit" (with Carlos Trvp)	2024	—	Non-album singles
"UpTown"	2024	—	Non-album singles
"Factory"	2024	—	Non-album singles
"Pray For Me"	2025	—	J4TS
"G-Shock" (with Pop Kreep)	2025	—	Non-album single

==== As featured artist ====
List of singles as a lead artist, with selected chart positions, showing year released and album name
Title	Year	Peak chart positions	Album
Title	Year	US	Album
"Luva" (Leeky G Bando featuring Bizzy Banks)	2020	—	Non-album singles
"Too Much" (Rah Swish featuring Bizzy Banks)	2020	—	Non-album singles
"Lightwork Freestyle" (Leeky G Bando featuring Bizzy Banks)	2020	—	Non-album singles
"What He Jackin?" (Masio Gunz featuring Bizzy Banks)	2020	—	Non-album singles
"Wockhardt" (Shawny Binladen featuring Bizzy Banks)	2020	—	Merry Wickmas
"Rockstar From The Trenches" (Stunna Gambino featuring Bizzy Banks)	2020	—	Vultures Don't Kry (Deluxe)
"Extorted" (Kha Structure featuring Bizzy Banks)	2021	—	Non-album singles
"Demonstrate" (Edot Babyy featuring Bizzy Banks)	2021	—	Non-album singles
"Hunnid Or Better" (Lil Eazzyy featuring Bizzy Banks)	2021	—	Rookie Of The Year
"Hit Back" (TG featuring Bizzy Banks)	2021	—	Visions
"John Cena" (Kha Structure featuring Bizzy Banks)	2023	—	Non-album single

=== Other charted and certified songs ===
List of charted songs, showing year released and album name
Title	Year	Peak chart positions			Album
Title	Year	US	US R&B /HH	CAN	Album
"30" (Pop Smoke featuring Bizzy Banks)	2021	97	39	48	Faith

=== Guest appearances ===
List of non-single guest appearances, with other performing artists, showing year released and album name
Title	Year	Other artists	Album
"All Star"	2019	Ciggy Blacc, Leeky G Bando	Dark Days
"Whole Lotta Wickery"	2020	Shawny Binladen	Merry Wickmas
"In This Bitch"	2021	Leeky G Bando	Big Structure Vol.1
"30"	2021	Pop Smoke	Faith
"Whip Parked"	2021	SosMula	13 Songs 2 Die 2
"Lose Control"	2022	YN Jay	Young, Wild & Free
"Tele"	2022	Leeky G Bando	Blood, Sweat & Tears
