= Rico Beats =

American record executive and songwriter

- Rico Beats in 2023

Background information
- Born: Ricardo Lamarre Brooklyn NY, U.S.
- Genres: Hip hop; trap; drill; R&B
- Occupations: Record executive; record producer; songwriter
- Instruments: Ableton; Logic Pro; Fantom; MP
- Years active: 2004−present
- Labels: Victor Victor; Universal

Ricardo Lamarre, known professionally as Rico Beats, is an American record executive, record producer, and songwriter. His most notable production credits are DJ Khaled's "Take That Off", Nicki Minaj's "Roman Reloaded", Soulja Boy's "Mean Mug", Iggy Azalea's "Comme Des Garcons" and Pusha T's "Exodus 23:1".

He previously co-managed the late American rapper Pop Smoke with American record executive Steven Victor.

== Career ==
In 2004, Rico decided he wanted to be a record producer when he was in college. Once he heard Needlz produce "Bang Bang" by Young Buck so he started following his work, and it turned out that they had a mutual friend, so he was introduced and it went from there. He really admired Needlz and bought the same equipment as him so that he could recreate his sound as best he could. Rico started using Needlz was using Logic at the time, and he saw his success with that but felt like it took too long to make a beat on there, so decided that he'd rather do his own thing with Ableton. He got into using Ableton because most people were using Fruity Loops and Logic Pro, so he started messing with Ableton to stand out and be different.

In 2010, he produced the song "Mean Mug" on Soulja Boy's album The DeAndre Way. Rico wanted to work on Nicki Minaj's first album, Pink Friday beat he missed out because he was working with Soulja Boy at the time. Nicki's manager, called Rico to send some beats when they started working on Nicki's second album Pink Friday: Roman Reloaded . He didn't have any beats at the time he called, so he made fifty beats within the next month and "Roman Reloaded" was the one Nicki ended up keeping. In January 2012, Rico was working in a studio in Los Angeles, trying to get more music on her album. She went there and played a snippet of "Roman Reloaded", but it wasn't finished yet. The full version of the song was released on February 24.

In 2013, Rico produced Pusha T's controversial "Exodus 23:1" which was diss to Drake. Lil Wayne was not too happy with the diss, yet his name never came up during the recording process. Rico told MTV News that the Young Money label was the last thing on their minds. He said, "Honestly, when we were in the room listening to that record, I didn't hear none of these guys' names brought up. It was none of that. Dream got in his zone and he went in the booth. Pusha got his pen, like I didn't hear nobody mentioned. Pusha kept tellin' me, I need something dark, man. The album sounds crazy, but I still need somethin' for my fans. So I was like, 'I got you, give me by six o' clock,' I went down to the studio and I was just listening to Biggie. I was just playin' pure Biggie.

Rico has already produced two tracks for Jadakiss's next album and one of them is going to feature rapper Jeezy. Rico is also working with Sean Kingston, Fabolous, Jay Z, and Jennifer Lopez just picked out one of his beats to use, but doesn't really know what to do with it yet.
