= Steven Victor =

American record executive

- Born: Steven William Victor; September 6, 1980 (age 46); Brooklyn, New York City, U.S.
- Education: Morehouse College
- Occupations: Record executive; talent manager; music publisher; A&R representative
- Years active: 2003–present
- Employer: Universal Music Group
- Title: Founder & CEO - Victor Victor Worldwide

Steven William Victor (born September 6, 1980) is an American record executive, talent manager, music publisher, and A&R representative.

He founded the record label Victor Victor Worldwide in 2016. The year prior, he was named chief creative officer (CCO) of Kanye West's GOOD Music record label, and also in 2016, he was named senior vice president of A&R at Universal Music Group—through which he reports directly to chairman Sir Lucian Grainge. The following year, he was named Head of A&R at Def Jam Recordings, although he departed in 2019 to return to Universal.

== Early life and education ==
Victor was born on September 6, 1980, in the Brooklyn borough of New York City, where he was also raised. He grew up in a multi-family home with his parents and older sister, along with his father's brother and sister's families. He attended Morehouse College in Atlanta from 1998 to 2002, where he graduated with a bachelor's degree in English and Psychology.

== Career ==
Victor began his career in 2003 with an unpaid internship as a publicist at Interscope Records, to which he was later promoted to publicity assistant in 2004, working in public relations for six years. During his tenure at Interscope, he met American rapper and record executive Pusha T, who at the time was one-half of the hip hop duo Clipse. He formed a mutual relationship with Pusha, becoming the publicist and manager for Clipse, and later solely for him.

In late 2015, Pusha T became president of GOOD Music, and appointed Victor as Chief operating officer of the label as his first course of action. In late 2016, he was appointed SVP of A&R at Universal Music Group, while simultaneously holding his position at GOOD. He also began managing Tyga, The-Dream, and Desiigner during this time, the latter of whom was signed by Victor to GOOD and Def Jam Recordings. In November of that year, he founded his own record label and music publishing company, Victor Victor Worldwide as a joint venture with Universal.

In October 2017, he was named EVP & Head of A&R at Def Jam, reporting to then-CEO Paul Rosenberg and replacing his position as SVP of A&R at Universal. In August 2019, he left Def Jam and transitioned back to his previous position at Universal, focusing on his label's joint venture with them.

== Victor Victor Worldwide ==
Victor Victor Worldwide Inc.
- Parent company: BMG Rights Management (since 2026)
- Founded: November 3, 2016; 9 years ago
- Founder: Steven Victor
- Distributors: Various (Note: Victor Victor Worldwide is a joint venture between the label and Universal Music Group, giving Victor Victor the power to sign an artist to a joint venture recording contract with their label and any other label under the Universal umbrella. Victor Victor also has the same joint venture structure with Universal Music Publishing Group for their publishing entity.); (in the US); Universal Music Group; (outside the US)
- Genre: Hip-hop; trap; drill; pop; R&B
- Country of origin: United States
- Location: New York City, New York
- Official website: victorvictor.com

Victor Victor Worldwide Inc. (formerly d/b/a as Victor Victor Records or simply Victor) is an American record label and music publishing company founded by Victor in New York City on November 3, 2016. It was founded as a joint venture with Universal Music Group that allows signees to enter contracts with labels under the Universal umbrella, although Victor Victor's releases have predominantly been through Republic Records. The label also has a similar joint venture structure with Universal Music Publishing Group for its publishing entity. On April 2026, Victor Victor signed a new venture with music company Concord, which merged with BMG later on the same year.

Victor Victor is best known for having signed late American rapper Pop Smoke, as well as rappers Ski Mask the Slump God and Pusha T; the former two were signed in conjunction with Republic Records. The label has also signed record producers 16yrold, CashMoneyAP, and YoungKio (with Cash Gang) with UMPG. Former notable artists signed to the label include American rapper D Savage—who was signed to Victor Victor and Republic in 2017, and later jointly with Capitol Records and Virgin Music before his 2019 departure—as well as rappers Summrs and Autumn.

Victor Victor also runs the management firm William Victor Management Group which has managed artists such as Pusha T, The-Dream, CashMoneyAP, and 16yrold, among others. A majority of the artists signed to the label are managed by the firm itself.

In June 2020, the label launched the Victor Victor Foundation, a philanthropic initiative which Victor himself has donated US$1 million towards in startup; Victor also donated $25,000 to the "Fund for Public Schools", a nonprofit organization in New York City.

=== Roster ===
==== Current ====
Artists	Year signed	Releases (under the label)	Notes
Ski Mask the Slump God	2017	4	Jointly with Republic
Pop Smoke	2019	4 (2 posthumous)	Jointly with Republic; deceased, died from home invasion in February 2020; posthumous releases handled by both labels.
Weiland	2020	2	Jointly with UMe
Nigo	2021	1	Jointly with Republic
Reyanna Maria	2021	4 (singles)	Jointly with Republic
Pusha T	2022	0	Jointly with Def Jam
Yoza	2022	1	Jointly with Def Jam
Highway	2022	2	Jointly with Geffen
Different Hits	2023	22 (singles)	Jointly with UMe and SunPop; record label imprint; releases reworks of older songs with newer artists as covers.
Hardrock	2023	1 (Virgin album), 3 (singles)	Jointly with Republic, formerly solely with Virgin
Molly Santana	2024	2	Jointly with Capitol
Prettifun	2025	2	Jointly with Too Lost (non Universal label)

==== Former ====
Artists	Years under the label	Releases under the label	Notes
Don Zio P	2017–2018	5 (singles)	Jointly with Republic
D. Savage	2017–2019	2	Jointly with Capitol and Virgin, formerly jointly with Republic
12 Honcho (Honcho Da Savage)	2017–2018	1 (album as Honcho Da Savage); 1 (single as 12 Honcho)	Jointly with Def Jam, formerly jointly with Republic
Senta The Artist	2020	1	Jointly with UMe
Summrs	2021	0	Jointly with Capitol; later signed to 10K Projects
Young Devyn	2021–2022	1	Jointly with 4th & B'way and Island; moved to Def Jam with 4th & B'way
Autumn	2021–2022	2	Jointly with Casablanca, formerly jointly with Republic
DJ Topgun	2023	1	Jointly with UMe
Subibabii	2022–2025	4	Jointly with Too Lost (non Universal label)

==== Publishing ====
===== In-house producers =====
Act	Years under the label	Releases under the label	Notes
As part of Victor Victor Worldwide (Recording)
16yrold	2017–present	5 (singles)	Jointly with Capitol, formerly jointly with Republic; joint publishing with UMPG
Axl	2020–present	1 (singles)	Jointly with Republic; joint publishing with UMPG
As part of Victor Victor Music (Publishing)
Rico Beats	2017–present	N/A	Jointly with UMPG and StarLife; co-manager of Pop Smoke & 808Melo
CashMoneyAP	2017–present	2 (Atlantic singles)	Jointly with UMPG and Cash Gang; signed as recording artist to Atlantic Records
YoungKio	2019–present	N/A	Jointly with UMPG and Cash Gang
808Melo	2019–present	N/A	Jointly with UMPG
Swirv	2020–present	N/A	Jointly with UMPG
SethInTheKitchen	2020–present	N/A	Jointly with UMPG
