= No Ceilings 3 =

Mixtape by Lil Wayne
- Released: A Side: November 27, 2020; B Side: December 18, 2020
- Recorded: 2020
- Length: A Side: 61:39; B Side: 41:26
- Label: Young Money
- Producer: Various: 1Mind; 808Melo; Adamslides; Ambezza; Asheton "Pluss" Hogan; Aviator Keyyz; Boi-1da; Blake Slatkin; Bryan Yepes; Buddah Bless; Cardo; CashMoneyAP; C-Clip Beatz; Cheese; Chi Chi; Chris King; Cicero; Cubeatz; DeeMarc; D. Hill; DJ Khaled; G. Ry; Hit-Boy; Hollywood Cole; Jabz; Julia Lewis; Kanye West; KBeaZy; Marshmello; Metro Boomin; Mike Will Made It; Myles Harris; The Neptunes; Nflated; Nils; Omer Fedi; OZ; Palaze; ProdByNicky; Pro J; The Pushers; Quay Global; RetroFuture; Robin Thicke; Rogét Chahayed; Scott Storch; Section 8; SMKEXCLSV; Southside; SVNDS; Syk Sense; Tay Keith; Teeyzi; TurnMeUpYC; Twysted Genius; Wheezy; Yung Exclusive

Lil Wayne chronology
| Funeral (2020) | No Ceilings 3 (2020) | Trust Fund Babies (2021) |

No Ceilings 3 is a double disc mixtape by American rapper Lil Wayne, hosted by DJ Khaled. The A Side was released on November 27, 2020. It features guest appearances from Drake, Young Thug, Gudda Gudda, Euro, Cory Gunz, HoodyBaby, Vice Versa, YD, and Jay Jones. The B Side was released on December 18, with additional guest appearances from Big Sean, Rich The Kid, Lil Twist, and 2 Chainz.

== Promotion ==
On August 28, 2020, Wayne re-released the 2009 mixtape No Ceilings for commercial release on streaming services. He also announced the second sequel to the mixtape during an interview on ESPN. On November 25, the mixtape was officially announced by DJ Khaled with the release date, previewing two songs. In an exclusive press release, Lil Wayne told Complex: "The mixtape game seemed to be a dying art and since I'm one of the pioneers of the craft, and it played such a big part in my career, I felt it was only right to resurrect it. Also, it's a lot of songs out here I wanted to kill my way." On December 1, "B.B. King Freestyle" was released commercially on streaming services.

== Track listing ==
A Side
| No. | Title | Original song (Artist) | Length |
|---|---|---|---|
| 1. | "V8" | "We Paid" (Lil Baby) | 2:36 |
| 2. | "B.B. King Freestyle" (featuring Drake) | "Feeling U, Feeling Me" (Alicia Keys) | 4:32 |
| 3. | "Lamar" | "Takeover" (Jay-Z) | 2:49 |
| 4. | "For the Night" | "For the Night" (Pop Smoke) | 2:19 |
| 5. | "Something Different" | "Laugh Now Cry Later" (Drake) | 2:51 |
| 6. | "Life Is Good" | "Life Is Good" (Future) | 3:03 |
| 7. | "Peggy Bundy" | "Said Sum" (Moneybagg Yo) | 3:12 |
| 8. | "Out West" (featuring Young Thug) | "Out West" (JackBoys and Travis Scott) | 3:54 |
| 9. | "Church" (featuring Euro, HoodyBaby, and Gudda Gudda) | "Murder on My Mind" (YNW Melly) | 4:38 |
| 10. | "Comme De Garcons" | "Dior" (Pop Smoke) | 2:39 |
| 11. | "Deep End" | | 3:01 |
| 12. | "Drag 'Em" (featuring Gudda Gudda) | "Mood" (24kGoldn) | 2:19 |
| 13. | "Drive-Bys" (featuring Vice Versa) | "Shake the Room" (Pop Smoke) | 2:12 |
| 14. | "FL4M3$" (featuring Lil Tune) | "24" (Money Man) | 3:37 |
| 15. | "3 Headed Goat" (featuring YD and Cory Gunz) | "3 Headed Goat" (Lil Durk) | 3:17 |
| 16. | "Hollywood" (featuring Young Carter) | "When You Down" (Lil Tecca) | 2:59 |
| 17. | "Kam" (featuring Kam Carter) | "Sicko Mode" (Travis Scott) | 2:30 |
| 18. | "Kamilla" (featuring Jay Jones) | "Baby" (Quality Control, Lil Baby, and DaBaby) | 2:48 |
| 19. | "2Diamonds" | "Bad Bad Bad" (Young Thug) | 2:50 |
| 20. | "Afro" | "No Dribble" (DaBaby) | 3:02 |
| Total length: | | | 61:39 |

B Side
| No. | Title | Original song (Artist) | Length |
|---|---|---|---|
| 1. | "Tyler Herro" (featuring Big Sean) | "Tyler Herro" (Jack Harlow) | 4:08 |
| 2. | "Layaway" | "Mixed Personalities" (YNW Melly) | 3:17 |
| 3. | "Low Down" | "Low Down" (Lil Baby) | 2:31 |
| 4. | "Throat Baby" (featuring Rich the Kid) | "Throat Baby" (BRS Kash) | 2:17 |
| 5. | "Beauty And The Beat" | "Rambo" (Bryson Tiller) | 2:37 |
| 6. | "Peanut Butter" | "Kacey Talk" (YoungBoy Never Broke Again) | 2:54 |
| 7. | "Pop Off" | "Down Bad" (Dreamville, J. Cole, JID, Bas, and EarthGang) | 2:53 |
| 8. | "Ring Ring" (featuring Euro) | "Dollaz on My Head" (Gunna) | 3:21 |
| 9. | "Baggin" | "Baggin'" (Marshmello and 42 Dugg) | 2:14 |
| 10. | "Burner" | "Trillionaire" (Future) | 3:04 |
| 11. | "Sum 2 Prove" | "Sum 2 Prove" (Lil Baby) | 2:44 |
| 12. | "These Hoes" | "Monster" (Future) | 2:41 |
| 13. | "My Room" (featuring Lil Twist) | "Lost Without U" (Robin Thicke) | 3:54 |
| 14. | "Hit Different" (featuring 2 Chainz) | "Hit Different" (SZA) | 2:43 |
| Total length: | | | 41:26 |
