= Shake the Room =

2020 song by Pop Smoke featuring Quavo

Single by Pop Smoke featuring Quavo

from the album Meet the Woo 2
- Released: March 28, 2020
- Genre: Drill
- Length: 2:45
- Label: Victor Victor; Republic
- Songwriters: Bashar Jackson; Quavious Marshall; Andre Loblack
- Producer: 808Melo

Pop Smoke singles chronology
| "Ordinary" (2020) | "Shake the Room" (2020) | "Make It Rain" (2020) |

Quavo singles chronology
| "Intentions" (2020) | "Shake the Room" (2020) | "Lottery (Quavo remix)" (2020) |

Music video
- "Shake the Room" on YouTube

"Shake the Room" is a song by American rapper Pop Smoke, featuring fellow rapper Quavo, from the former's second mixtape, Meet the Woo 2 (2020). The two artists wrote the song with its producer 808Melo. It was released as the mixtape's second single on March 28, 2020. The song was solely produced by the latter of the three. A drill track, it sees Pop Smoke and Quavo rap about someone who understands the streets.

"Shake the Room" received generally positive reviews from music critics, with several of them praising it as a highlight of the mixtape. The song peaked at number 93 on the US Billboard Hot 100 and number 76 on the UK Singles Chart. It was certified gold in the United States by the Recording Industry Association of America (RIAA). An accompanying music video was released on March 28, 2020, and was directed by Virgil Abloh, making it Pop Smoke's first posthumous video since he was shot and killed at the age of 20. The visual features the latter and Quavo taking part in several activities in Paris; such as doing donuts in a red Ferrari.

== Background and composition ==
The song was written by Pop Smoke, known as Bashar Jackson, alongside Quavo, who has the real name of Quavious Marshall, and 808Melo, who has the real name of Andre Loblack. The track was produced and programmed by the latter of the three. Mastering and mixing were both handled by Jess Jackson, while Corey Nutile was the song's recording engineer and Corey Nutile was credited as an assistant recording engineer. On February 7, 2020, "Shake the Room" was released as the second track on Pop Smoke's second mixtape Meet the Woo 2. It was later released as the mixtape's second single on March 28, 2020.

Writing for Revolt, Jon Powell described the song as a drill track. Dominiq R. of HotNewHipHop said the song is "led by a harmonious vocal and bass-driven woodwind instrumentation", and that "Quavo incorporates his own patented melodies to the beat adding another layer of elements while a thunderous 808 drives the drum sequencing". He continued, commenting that Pop Smoke "kicks off the song with the chorus before Quavo takes off on the instrumental delivering bars about controlling the energy of any room he's in". He concluded, saying Quavo raps "his verse in another direction, spittin' braggadocios bars about his new-found wealth". Erin Lowers of Exclaim! mentioned that the song establishes "someone who understands the streets but still has a witty attitude to play with music and show his personality".

== Reception ==
"Shake the Room" was met with generally positive reviews from music critics. Writing for Pitchfork magazine, Reed Jackson described the song as "haunting" and "meditative", and said it demonstrates "[808Melo's] beatmaker's sonic growth". Dhruva Balram of NME opined that Pop Smoke easily outshines Quavo on the song, and praised it as one of the mixtapes highlights. Writing for Billboard magazine, Michael Saponara stated "Shake the Room" was quickly "tabbed a fan-favorite off Meet the Woo 2", and that it continues to pick up steam. Danny Schwartz of The Ringer lauded the song as the "colossal centerpiece" of Meet the Woo 2. Essence's writer Brooklyn White viewed "Welcome to the Party", Dior", and "Shake the Room" as anthems of Brooklyn, New York. Bernadette Giacomazzo of HipHopDX commented that Pop Smoke and Quavo did "just fine" on the song, but said "there are absolutely zero reasons for these two to be in the studio together".

"Shake the Room" peaked at number 93 on the US Billboard Hot 100 on March 7, 2020. The song has also peaked at number 43 on the US Hot R&B/Hip-Hop Songs chart. It further peaked at number 98 on the Canadian Hot 100 and number 76 on the UK Singles Chart. "Shake the Room" was certified gold by the Recording Industry Association of America (RIAA), denoting track-equivalent sales and streams of 500,000 units in the United States.

== Music video ==
=== Background and synopsis ===
Off-White founder and Louis Vuitton artistic director Virgil Abloh reached out to Pop Smoke on Instagram for the creation of a music video for "Shake the Room". Abloh revealed on how the video for the song was created: "[Pop Smoke's] impact will live on thru the art he left us. In this case, it was the night after the [Louis Vuitton] show while we had the cameras rolling inside & outside a typical French restaurant in my neighborhood." The music video was released on March 28, 2020. It was directed by Abloh's Off-White International Rap Video Production Studio in Paris during Paris Fashion Week. It marked Pop Smoke's first posthumous music video after he was shot and killed at the age of 20 during a home invasion in Los Angeles, California.

The video begins with an intro, reading: "This video is real life footage. This is barely a 'video shoot'." It features Pop Smoke and Quavo enjoying their lives in the City of Light while driving in front of the Hôtel des Invalides. The scene then switches to them being in a fancy Parisian restaurant, with both rappers eating expensive meals and drinking wine, while Pop Smoke blows out some candles on top of a birthday cake. They bring life to the quiet area and due to their presence, a small party happens within the restaurant. Pop Smoke and Quavo later cause chaos in the streets of Paris as they spin around in their red Ferrari Pista, doing donuts. The video ends with the final credits cut out. It goes on for a minute, featuring a moment of silence for Pop Smoke. It has a still frame that reads: "In Loving Memory, Pop Smoke Forever".

=== Critical reception ===
The music video was met with positive reviews from critics. Nicholas Li of Hypebeast stated that the video mixes "lo-fi and hi-def clips with quick cuts and trippy edits". Michael Love of Paper magazine, and the staff of Rap-Up, described the visual as "grainy". Dazed writer Thom Waite labeled the clips in the video as "candid". Writing for Billboard magazine, Hilary Hughes opined that Paris provides a "stunning backdrop for [Pop Smoke and Quavo]". She continued, saying "Pop Smoke and Quavo are all smiles as they trade verses on the track while hyping up themselves". L'Oréal of WQHT called the video "fast" and "fun".

== Live performances ==
Quavo performed "Shake the Room" and "Aim for the Moon" live at the 2020 BET Hip Hop Awards in October. The rapper performed the song in a futuristic styled white room, as on video billboards outside the room's window, Pop Smoke's verses and choruses would be displayed. Quavo wore a jean jacket with "Shoot for the Stars" on the front and "Aim for the Moon" on the back while performing.

== Credits and personnel ==
Credits adapted from Tidal.

- Bashar Jackson – vocals, songwriter
- Quavious Marshall – vocals, songwriter
- Andre Loblack – producer, programming, songwriter
- Jess Jackson – mixing engineer, mastering engineer
- Corey Nutile – recording engineer
- Sage Skofield – assistant mixing engineer

== Charts ==
Weekly chart performance for "Shake the Room"
| Chart (2020) | Peak position |
|---|---|
| Canada Hot 100 (Billboard) | 98 |
| UK Singles (Official Charts) | 76 |
| US Billboard Hot 100 | 93 |
| US Hot R&B/Hip-Hop Songs (Billboard) | 43 |

== Certifications ==
Certifications and sales for "Shake the Room"
| Region | Certification | Certified units/sales |
|---|---|---|
| United Kingdom (BPI) | Silver | 200,000^{‡} |
| United States (RIAA) | Gold | 500,000^{‡} |
^{‡} Sales+streaming figures based on certification alone.
