= Aim for the Moon =

2020 song by Pop Smoke featuring Quavo

"Aim for The Moon"

Song by Pop Smoke featuring Quavo

from the album Shoot for the Stars, Aim for the Moon
- Released: July 3, 2020
- Genre: Drill
- Length: 2:55
- Label: Victor Victor; Republic
- Songwriters: Bashar Jackson; Quavious Marshall; Andre Loblack; Ebony Oshunrinde; Sadiki Forbes; Daniel Deleyto; Tyy Beats; Dylan Cleary-Krell
- Producers: 808Melo; WondaGurl; 5ive Beatz; Tyy Beats; Dani; Dez Wright

Music video
- "Aim for the Moon" on YouTube

"Aim for the Moon" is a song by American rapper Pop Smoke featuring fellow American rapper Quavo. It was posthumously released as a track from the former's debut studio album, Shoot for the Stars, Aim for the Moon, on July 3, 2020, as well as the EP For The Night (2020). The song was written alongside producers 808Melo, WondaGurl, and 5ive Beatz, Dez Wright, Dani, and Tyy Beats. Serving as a drill track, it sees Pop Smoke and Quavo rap about their successes.

The song received positive reviews from music critics, with a number of them praising its production. "Aim for the Moon" debuted and peaked at number 34 on the US Billboard Hot 100 and number 27 on the Canadian Hot 100. An accompanying music video was released on October 26, 2020. It was directed by Oliver Cannon and features Bouba Savage playing Pop Smoke and an unnamed kid playing Quavo, as young versions of the rappers. The visual takes inspiration from The Notorious B.I.G.'s single "Sky's the Limit". The video received positive reviews, with one critic describing it as "bittersweet". WondaGurl won Jack Richardson Producer of the Year Award at the 2021 Juno Awards for producing the song.

== Background and release ==
Steven Victor originally wanted "Aim for the Moon" to be the intro to a mixtape by Pop Smoke, but the latter declined, saying he wanted to make the song the album's intro. The rapper loved "Aim for the Moon", saying, "Yo, this is fire. We've got to keep this for the album." Victor recalled how everyone knew the song was the first track that was going to end up on Shoot for the Stars, Aim for the Moon. They were in a studio with Travis Scott, working on "Gatti" and a couple of other songs. Victor admitted the song was originally supposed to be on Scott's album, but the latter just took it. Quavo explained that he was at a recording studio called No Name Studios in Los Angeles working on "Snitching" when Pop Smoke came from a different recording studio and showed him "Aim for the Moon". He stated that Pop Smoke had created the song in around 30 minutes. 5ive Beatz said he was also in Los Angeles at the time, making beats, when Travis Scott called his friend WondaGurl for some beats. She sent him back a pack with a couple of 5ive Beatz beats in it. WondaGurl commented that Pop Smoke really enjoyed her beats, and asked her to fly out to a resort in the Bahamas to work with him. They all ended up staying in different rooms but would go into the main studio where Pop Smoke was recording. WondaGurl showed the beat she made to Pop Smoke, who ended up recording with it. Afterward, 808Melo took the beat's sound and continued to work on it. She said it was then all over the internet. WondaGurl stated that she was very grateful to be part of the song's making and was thankful to get to work with Pop Smoke.

The song was written by Pop Smoke, known as Bashar Jackson, alongside Quavo, who has the real name of Quavious Marshall, Andre Loblack, Ebony Oshunrinde, Dez Wright, Tyy Beats, Dylan Cleary-Krell, Sadiki Forbes, Tyrone Penman, and Daniel Deleyto. It was produced by 808Melo and WondaGurl, while co-produced by Dez Wright, Tyy Beats, and Dani. Mixing was handled by Jess Jackson, while Rose Adams, Sage Skofield, and Sean Solymar were credited as assistant mixers. WondaGurl, Forbes, Penman, Deleyto, and Cleary-Krell handled the song's programming. Barrington Hall, Nate Alford, Corey Nutile were credited as the song's recording engineers, while the latter dealt with the song's recording. On July 3, 2020, "Aim for the Moon" was released as the second track on Pop Smoke's debut posthumous studio album Shoot for the Stars, Aim for the Moon.

== Music and lyrics ==
Critics have described "Aim for the Moon" as a drill track. Jade Gomez of Paste opined that the song isa "blistering intro with stuttery Hi-hats and brooding bass perfect for the club or car speaker". Roisin O'Connor of The Independent mentioned that the song has a "hi-hat patter". According to A.D. Amorosi of Variety, "Aim For The Moon" uses braggadocio and has a "cymbal-tapping groove, mixed with gravelly bass" to drop "the depth of a freshly-dug grave" and allow "the rappers to sound as if they're flying high above the fray". Gomez said the track "reflects on Pop Smoke's successes from his roots ('Mr Dior-Dior, they know where it started'), referencing his 2019 hit 'Dior,' to his lavish life filled with women, parties and drugs." Gomez said Quavo has "brilliant chemistry with Pop Smoke on [the] track", and that his "sing-songy delivery play[s] well against the rougher vocals". Briana Younger of NPR noted the lyrics discuss the success that Pop Smoke was just beginning to see.

== Critical reception ==
"Aim for the Moon" was met with generally positive reviews from music critics, with a number of them praising the production. Writing for Vulture, Craig Jenkins labeled the song as "grim" and said it is a "foreboding cut". Gary Suarez of Entertainment Weekly depicted the song as an "aspirational fulfillment". David Crone of AllMusic said the song is one of the album's highlights. In his review for Clash, Mike Milenko commented that Pop Smoke and Quavo worked well together, that their chemistry was "astounding", and said the combination of both rappers "not only works, it works incredibly well". Writing for The Wall Street Journal, Mark Richardson viewed the song as a "cavernous low end that seems to gather energy and then lash out like a venomous snake". Earmilk's Ashton Howard depicted the song's beat as "grime", with him noting it showcases what made Pop Smoke so popular with his young fans. Younger wrote that "Aim for the Moon" has a "triumphant sheen to it". Some reviewers viewed the song more negatively. Alphonse Pierre of Pitchfork described "Aim for the Moon" as a "hollow Astroworld retread." David Arron Blake of HipHopDX stated that Quavo "categorically" failed to keep up with Pop Smoke "creatively and sonically", opining, that he consistently lagged behind the beat and delivered "sloppy" and "underwritten" verses. He continued, saying Quavo's adlibs "actively undermine and distract from the sonic world-building which makes Pop Smoke's music so captivating".

Following the release of Shoot for the Stars, Aim for the Moon, "Aim for the Moon" debuted and peaked at number 34 on the US Billboard Hot 100. The song simultaneously peaked at number 16 on the US Hot R&B/Hip-Hop Songs chart. It further peaked at number 27 on the Canadian Hot 100, number 65 in Australia, and number 58 in France.

== Music video ==
=== Background and synopsis ===
A music video for "Aim for the Moon" was directed by Oliver Cannon and was released on October 26, 2020. The visual pays tribute to the music video for the Notorious B.I.G.'s 1997 single "Sky's the Limit". The music video features Bouba Savage playing Pop Smoke and an unnamed child playing Quavo as young versions of the rappers. The young versions of Pop Smoke and Quavo show off their lavish lifestyle inside of a mansion. The two ride together in a Rolls-Royce with a "Woo" New York vanity plate, drink champagne while floating in a swimming pool, wear rock gold chains while eating hamburgers that are served on a silver platter by a butler, and get their hands on stacks of 100 dollar bills that they throw up in the air.

=== Reception ===
The music video was met with positive reviews from critics. Writing for Uproxx, Aaron Williams stated that Savage "perfectly lip-sync[s] the pulsating drill song's boastful lyrics". Joe Price of Complex described the visual as "flashy". The music video was praised by Billboard's Jason Lupshutz, who called it a "loving homage to the Notorious B.I.G.'s 'Sky's The Limit'" and a "lavish tribute to Pop Smoke's outlandish party track". He continued, admitting that the visual is a "charming" and "somewhat inevitably bittersweet experience that synchs up with the song's ethos".

== Live performances ==
Quavo performed "Shake the Room" and "Aim for the Moon" live at the 2020 BET Hip Hop Awards in October. The rapper performed the song in a futuristic styled white room, as on video billboards outside the room's window, Pop Smoke's verses and choruses would be displayed. Quavo wore a jean jacket with "Shoot for the Stars" on the front and "Aim for the Moon" on the back while performing.

== Credits and personnel ==
Credits adapted from Tidal.

- Pop Smoke – vocals, songwriter
- Quavo – vocals, songwriter
- 808Melo – producer, programming, songwriter
- WondaGurl – producer, programming, songwriter
- Dez Wright – co-producer, programming, songwriter
- Tyy Beats – co-producer, programming, songwriter
- Dani – co-producer, songwriter, programming
- 5ive Beatz – songwriter, programming
- Jess Jackson – mixing engineer
- Corey Nutile – engineer, recording engineer
- Barrington Hall – recording engineer
- Nate Alford – recording engineer
- Sean Solymar – assistant mixer
- Rose Adams – assistant mixer
- Sage Skofield – assistant mixer

== Charts ==
Weekly chart performance for "Aim for the Moon"
Chart (2020)	Peak position
Australia (ARIA)	65
Canada Hot 100 (Billboard)	27
France (SNEP)	58
Iceland (Tónlistinn)	33
US Billboard Hot 100	34
US Hot R&B/Hip-Hop Songs (Billboard)	16
