= Forever Pop (song) =

2020 song by Lil Tjay

Song by Lil Tjay
- Released: February 20, 2020
- Length: 2:28
- Label: Columbia; Sony
- Producer: Othello

"Forever Pop" is a song by American rapper and singer Lil Tjay. It was released on February 20, 2020, and was produced by Othello. A clap-driven, mid-tempo song, Lil Tjay pays homage to his close friend and fellow collaborator Pop Smoke, who was shot and killed at the age of 20 during a home invasion on February 19, 2020, in Hollywood Hills. It samples Pop Smoke's song "Like Me", which features American rapper PnB Rock. The song received positive reviews from music critics, with some of them describing it as emotional and heartbreaking.

== Background and release ==
On February 19, 2020, American rapper Pop Smoke was shot and killed at the age of 20 during a home invasion. Four hooded men, one of whom was carrying a handgun, broke into a Hollywood Hills house Pop Smoke was renting. A 15-year-old boy, the youngest of the four intruders, shot Pop Smoke three times in the chest with a Beretta M9 after fighting with him. The robbers stole Pop Smoke's diamond-studded Rolex watch, which they sold for $2,000. Pop Smoke was rushed to Cedars-Sinai Medical Center, where doctors performed a thoracotomy on the left side of his chest, but a few hours later, he was pronounced dead. Fellow American rapper Lil Tjay was a close friend to Pop Smoke and collaborated with him on the tracks "War" and "Mannequin". On February 20, 2020, a day after Pop Smoke was killed, Lil Tjay released a tribute song titled "Forever Pop". The track was produced by Othello.

== Music and lyrics ==
"Forever Pop" is a clap-driven, mid-tempo track. It samples Pop Smoke's song "Like Me", which features American rapper PnB Rock and is from the former's second deluxe mixtape Meet the Woo 2 (2020). Alex Griffin for GRM Daily mentions the song is delivered in Lil Tjay's "distinctive" style and tone which "takes no shame in putting his pain on full display". The staff of Rap-Up stated Lil Tjay shares "his sorrow while grappling with the devastating loss". Joshua Espinoza of Complex said that Lil Tjay struggles to "wrap his head around the tragic news, while vowing to make sure Pop Smoke's legacy lives on". He continued, saying he also "recalls the moment he learned about his friend's untimely death and the ways it immediately changed his perspective on life". Legend of OnSmash said the song finds Lil Tjay rapping about the dangers of the streets while paying homage to Pop Smoke.

Lil Tjay raps: "Took you out your glory, who wanna see you lose?/Woke up in the mornin', see my nigga on the news/And I'm still like 'Damn,' tryna put together screws/Said a lot, but still it feel like I ain't even speak yet/Tryna hit a pocket that I still ain't even reach yet/But I still can't comprehend this shit, it hit me in the heart." The song ends with a clip of Pop Smoke speaking to Angie Martinez during an interview on The Angie Martinez Show about the pressures he faced to succeed. Pop Smoke says: "I'ma say, give like a message to my young niggas, you feel me. Like niggas like us, coming where we come from, we can't afford to fuck up. We can't afford to slip up, make no mistakes, you heard? 'Cause, they watchin', and they want us to. You know what I'm sayin'? We got all odds against us."

== Critical reception ==
Legend described the track as a "heartfelt record", while the staff of Rap-Up called it an "emotional Auto-Tuned track". Aaron Williams, writing for Uproxx, opined the track is "especially poignant, as it isn't just a tribute to a fallen rapper but to a close friend and cohort". Patrick Johnson for Hypebeast described Pop Smoke's interview in the track as "eerily foreboding".
