= Ordinary (PnB Rock song) =

Single by PnB Rock featuring Pop Smoke
- Released: February 12, 2020
- Genre: Drill
- Length: 3:12
- Label: Atlantic Records

Pop Smoke singles chronology
"Dior" (2020)	"Ordinary" (2020)	"Shake the Room" (2020)

PnB Rock singles chronology
"Fendi" (2019)	"Ordinary" (2020)	"Rose Gold" (2020)

"Ordinary" is a song by American rapper PnB Rock featuring American rapper Pop Smoke.

== Background and release ==
American rapper PnB Rock released his sophomore album TrapStar Turnt PopStar in 2019, with it hitting number four on the US Billboard 200. In January 2020, PnB Rock became involved in a street race in Burbank, California, and crashed his car into other parked vehicles, injuring two people in the process. He was arrested for driving under the influence and reckless driving. American rapper Pop Smoke released his sophomore mixtape Meet the Woo 2 on February 7, 2020. Less than a week later, he released a deluxe version of the mixtape featuring new songs and remixes, including "Like Me" featuring PnB Rock. PnB Rock released "Ordinary" on February 12, 2020, featuring Pop Smoke. It was PnB Rock's first release since "Fundi" with Nicki Minaj and Murda Beatz in 2019. Just days after the track was released, on February 19, 2020, Pop Smoke was shot and killed at the age of 20 during a home invasion.

== Music and lyrics ==
"Ordinary" is a drill song. The staff of BrooklynVegan mentioned "Ordinary" went in a "darker, harder direction", compared to PnB Rocks other music. Patrick Johnson of Hypebeast stated the song featured Pop Smoke's "signature raspy delivery" over an "ominous and hard-hitting beat". "Ordinary" begins with Pop Smoke saying "woo" numerous times and rapping in the first half of the song, with PnB Rock then rapping for the rest of the song. Lyrically, PnB Rock and Pop Smoke rap about different luxury brands they own in the chorus and during their respective verses.

== Performances and critical reception ==
PnB Rock performed "Ordinary" live in Philadelphia on February 16, 2020. The staff of WQHT said the track is "fire", with Trace William Cowen for Complex saying the song "pairs nicely" with "Like Me". Alex Zidel of HotNewHipHop called it "boisterous", mentioning that both rappers were "proving to be quite the formidable duo". Writing for Revolt, Jon Powell described "Ordinary" as a "hard-hitting release" and "infectious", saying PnB Rock and Pop Smoke had "obvious chemistry" and that they needed to collaborate on more music.
