= Make It Rain (Pop Smoke song) =

2020 single by Pop Smoke featuring Rowdy Rebel

Single by Pop Smoke featuring Rowdy Rebel

from the album Shoot for the Stars, Aim for the Moon
- Released: June 12, 2020
- Genre: Drill
- Length: 3:24
- Label: Victor Victor; Republic
- Songwriters: Bashar Jackson; Chad Marshall; Alyamani Ouadah
- Producers: Yamaica; Rico Beats; 808Melo

Pop Smoke singles chronology
"Shake the Room" (2020)	"Make It Rain" (2020)	"The Woo" (2020)

Rowdy Rebel singles chronology
"Till I Die" (2019)	"Make It Rain" (2020)	"Jesse Owens" (2021)

"Make It Rain" is a song by American rapper Pop Smoke, released on June 12, 2020, as the lead single from his posthumous debut studio album, Shoot for the Stars, Aim for the Moon, released on July 3, 2020. The song features vocals from rapper Rowdy Rebel, whose verse was recorded over a phone, as he was in jail at the time.

== Background ==
The song marks Pop Smoke's first release as a lead artist following his death in February 2020. The track was first announced a day before its release, on June 11, 2020, by Pop Smoke's manager, Steven Victor, who announced the delay of Smoke's debut album and instead released "Make It Rain" as the lead single on the day the album was originally scheduled for release. Victor stated that out of respect for the George Floyd protests, "we have decided to delay the release of his album out of respect for the movement". Victor also helped launch the Victor Victor Foundation, a non-profit organization which works to support Black youths through voter registration efforts and aid programs focused on mentorship and emotional support. The announcement of the song teased a mystery feature on the track, which eventually turned out to be Rowdy Rebel, a member of Bobby Shmurda's GS9 crew. Rebel has been incarcerated since 2014, when New York police rounded the whole SG group up and charged them with gang-related crimes. Hence, Rebel's verse was recorded telephonically.

== Composition ==
"Make It Rain" was produced by Yamaica, Rico Beats and frequent Pop Smoke collaborater 808Melo. The song delivers Pop Smoke's signature drill style. Soundigest's Luke Wells noted that the song "sticks to his [Pop Smoke] foundational roots of jaunty hip-hop with an infectious, hammering beat underscored by deep, booming vocals. His voice is idiosyncratic — distinct to the point of unmistakability".

== Critical reception ==
Jason Lipshutz of Billboard listed "Make it Rain" as one of the most essential releases of the week, calling it "classic Pop Smoke, with a wall-shattering beat and enough chest-thumping lyrics to ensure that the rapper's gravelly voice never loses your attention. Lipshutz opined that "listening to the song in the greater context of a career cut way too short makes for a jarring experience, yet 'Make It Rain' also captures Pop Smoke at his most triumphant, and it's a fitting pose". Tom Breihan of Stereogum praised the track as "a monstrous drill track that does not feel like a half-finished leftover" and further found it to be "a real bittersweet pleasure to hear Pop's tremendous gruff voice-of-God flow once again". Luke Wells of Soundigest had a similar sentiment, saying "It's commonplace for posthumous releases to mark a decline in quality, but such is not the case with 'Make It Rain'". Pitchfork's Sheldon Pearce commended the song, writing: "Posthumous releases often bring diminishing returns, but here Pop Smoke retains the intensity that made him great". Pearce labelled Rowdy Rebel's verse as "defiant and uncaged", further pointing out Pop Smoke's distinctness: "What really separated Pop Smoke from other local drill rappers is that thundering voice; its thick husk still feels coarse, severe, and unavoidable. The pounding Yamaica production quakes beneath him, as all the most menacing drill beats do, but his rhymes cut through commotion. He raps like he's unstoppable, and he sounds like it too". In a 4/5-star review, The Musical Hype complimented the "banging production" by Yamaica, stating "the synths are hellish, while the beat anchors things down superbly" and applauded Pop Smoke for being "tough AF. His rhymes are hard-nosed and unapologetic", while admmitting that although Rowdy Rebel's verse lacks quality due to it being recorded over a phone, he still sounds "rowdy". Earmilk's Nathan Whittle-Olivieri was particularly fond of the song's production: " the spectral, barebones instrumental allows the vocals to shine in hook after hook ripe with abrasion and personality. Dutch beatmaker and producer Yamaica lets twinkling synth leads bubble beneath blown-out bass in what feels like a fully idealized track completed before Smoke's passing".

== Music video ==
A 3-D-style video was released alongside the song.

== Charts ==
Chart (2020)	Peak position
Australia (ARIA)	73
Canada (Canadian Hot 100)	35
New Zealand Hot Singles (RMNZ)	11
UK Singles (OCC)	73
US Billboard Hot 100	49
US Hot R&B/Hip-Hop Songs (Billboard)	21
US Rolling Stone Top 100	23
