= Christopher Walking =

2020 song by Pop Smoke

Single by Pop Smoke

from the album Meet the Woo 2
- Released: January 16, 2020
- Genre: Drill
- Length: 3:10
- Label: Victor Victor; Republic
- Songwriters: Bashar Jackson; Alex Petit; Ebony Oshunrinde; Derrick Gray; Dylan Cleary Krell
- Producers: CashMoneyAP; WondaGurl

Pop Smoke singles chronology
"Mary Jane" (2020)	"Christopher Walking" (2020)	"Slide (remix)" (2020)

Music video
- "Christopher Walking" on YouTube

"Christopher Walking" is a song by American rapper Pop Smoke that was officially released on his second mixtape, Meet the Woo 2 (2020). The song was written by Pop Smoke, alongside Derrick Gray, Dylan Cleary Krell, and producers CashMoneyAP & WondaGurl. The song was initially released for free digital download as the lead single from the mixtape on January 16, 2020, by Victor Victor Worldwide and Republic Records. It is a drill track that sees Pop Smoke comparing himself to Frank White, a character played by the song's namesake Christopher Walken, from the 1990 American crime thriller film King of New York.

The song interpolates the lyrics of 50 Cent's single "Window Shopper". "Christopher Walking" received generally positive reviews from music critics, with several of them praising its lyrics. An accompanying music video was released the same day as the single release, which was directed by Brennan Rowe. The video features Pop Smoke driving around Brooklyn in a BMW M850i meeting fans. Interpolated is footage of historical Black American figures and other revolutionaries.

== Background and composition ==
Taking to Instagram, Pop Smoke teased a preview of the song a few days before its January 16, 2020 release. Fans started to notice that Pop Smoke was criticizing fellow Brooklyn rappers Casanova and Smoove L in the song's preview, mentioning the former as "Trashanova" and the latter as "Scary L". The song was written by Pop Smoke, known as Bashar Jackson, alongside Alex Petit, Ebony Oshunrinde, Derrick Gray, and Dylan Cleary Krell. The first two of the four, who have the stage names of CashMoneyAP and WondaGurl, handled the song's production, while the former was credited as the song's programmer. Corey Nutile handled the song's recording, while Jess Jackson mixed it. Sage Skofield was credited as an assistant mixing engineer. "Christopher Walking" was released on January 16, 2020, by Victor Victor Worldwide and Republic Records as the lead single from Meet the Woo 2.

Musically, "Christopher Walking" is a drill track. The song sees Pop Smoke comparing himself to Frank White, a character played by Christopher Walken in the 1990 American neo-noir crime thriller film King of New York. It prominently interpolates the lyrics of 50 Cent's 2005 hit single "Window Shopper". Pop Smoke raps about taking shots at his enemies throughout the streets, and mentions his love for Dior and bust-downed jewelry. Reed Jackson of Pitchfork magazine stated that Pop Smoke raps about threatening to fight with someone, declaring he wants to "tie that boy up like a cowboy". Pop Smoke raps: "We gon' tie that boy up like a cowboy/I'm the one that they envy like Calboy/Broke bitches ain’t allowed/She wanna fuck with a real one, but real niggas back in style/I ain't no window shopper, your man out here window shoppin'/I be in all the stores, and no, we ain't window shoppin'."

== Critical reception ==
"Christopher Walking" has been met with mainly positive reviews from music critics. Bianca Gracie of Paper magazine called the song a "head-rushing hit". Erin Lowers, writing for Exclaim!, described the track as "fresh", and said it is "the power of short and sweet". The staff of HipHopDX praised the song as a "danceable Brooklyn drill rap anthem". Courtney Wynter of GRM Daily stated that the song is a "forceful Cashmoney AP-produced beat with his distinct low tones and boastful lyrics". Torsten Ingvaldsen of Hypebeast labeled the song as "characteristic". Gary Suarez of Entertainment Weekly cited it as one of the highlight tracks off Meet the Woo 2.

Writing for Stereogum, Tom Breihan opined that "Christopher Walking" has the same "eerie singsong charisma" as "Window Shopper", mentioning that it possesses the "ability to be sweet but threatening at the same time". He continued, saying the rapper has a "sound as thick and dark and absorbing as his voice", which sounds "casual and conversational, cool and uncaring. But he also sounds like a horseman of the apocalypse." Breihan concluded by saying it is a "strong combination". "Christopher Walking" was praised by Complex's Andre Gee, who described it as "urgent", "cocky", and so "charismatic that certain lines stayed in our head all year". He concluded by saying: "The sheer force of Pop [Smoke's] vocal presence is impossible to deny, though." BrooklynVegan's Andrew Sacher wrote when Pop Smoke declared himself "the king of New York", he "already sounded believable". Thomas Hobb of The Independent lauded the track as exhilarating, and opined it "bottled the energy of free-falling between two skyscrapers, cape flapping behind, as the street-smart MC convincingly framed himself as a black superhero".

=== Year-end lists ===
"Christopher Walking" on year-end lists
Publication	List	Rank	Ref.
Complex	The Best Songs of 2020	3	
The Guardian	Best Music of 2020	—N/a	

== Music video ==
A music video for "Christopher Walking" was released the same day as the song. The video was directed by Brennan Rowe. It features Pop Smoke driving around New York (mainly Brooklyn) in a BMW M850i, showing his sense of style and attire as he meets fans while passing by them. The video later shows intertwined archive footage of Malcolm X (including footage of X's speech "By Any Means Necessary"), Black Panther protests, the Rodney King riots, other historical Black American figures such as Huey P. Newton and Fred Hampton, and other revolutionaries including Joseph Stalin. Writing for The Fader, David Renshaw described the visual as "glossy". Wynter opined that the "visuals for 'Christopher Walking' capture the song's jumpy vibe". Ryan Shepard of Def Pen stated that it was "definitely a major step up as [Pop Smoke] continue[d] to rise from New York to international success".

== Credits and personnel ==
Credits adapted from Tidal.

- Bashar Jackson – vocals, songwriter
- Alex Petit – producer, programming, songwriter
- Ebony Oshunrinde – producer, songwriter
- Dylan Cleary Krell – songwriter
- Derrick Gray – songwriter
- Corey Nutile – recording engineer
- Jess Jackson – mixing engineer
- Sage Skofield – mixing engineer assistant
