= Baby Osama =

American rapper and singer (born 2003)

- Also known as: Baby Osamaa
- Born: July 2003 (age 23); New York City, U.S.
- Genres: Pluggnb; sexy drill; alternative hip-hop
- Occupations: Rapper; singer
- Instrument: Vocals
- Years active: 2021–present
- Label: Cavity

Baby Osama (born July 2003) is an American rapper and singer. She began releasing music professionally in 2021 and her album Sexc Summer was released in 2024.

== Life and career ==
Baby Osama was born in July 2003 in the South Bronx. She has a younger sister, with whom she started a clothing line in 2024, and an older brother, who, as of 2024, is in prison. Her mother died when she was eight years old. She began freestyle rapping while in high school, participating in cyphers in a park near her school. She soon started performing at open mics that she found on Eventbrite.

Baby Osama released her debut song, "Miami", on YouTube in March 2021, which was followed by her first SoundCloud release, "Bullets". In October 2022, Baby Osama released several singles on SoundCloud, including "RX Baby". She released Tank Girl, her debut extended play, in the summer of 2023. Her mixtape Sexc Summer was released in July 2024. It features her single "Free Max B", which was released in February of that year. Also in July 2024, she performed at the fourth edition of Mike's Young World music festival. The Fader listed her single "I Don't Mean It" as one of the best hip hop songs of 2024, while Pitchfork included it on their list of the best songs of the year. Complex praised her that year as one of "the most exciting new rappers today".

Baby Osama was featured on a remix of WoochieWobbler's song "Dog Bich" released in February 2025. In late 2025, a video of her performing her freestyle "Bar 4 Bar" became popular on social media. Her album Skidmarks was released in November 2025 and distributed by Roc Nation Distribution, along with a music video for its single "Canal Booster".

== Musical style ==
Baby Osama's music has been described as pluggnb, sexy drill, sample drill, and alternative hip-hop. For The Fader, Steffanee Wang listed her in 2024 among "a wave of young women, including Ice Spice [and] BB Trickz ... using [sample drill] to mine at the intersection of girlish and hyper-feminine and the harder, more traditionally masculine". Israel Daramola of Defector called her "the best example of NY's underground rap scene, bouncing between drill and more experimental post-SoundCloud production". Her lyrics often revolve around death and drugs. In 2022, Alphonse Pierre of Pitchfork described Baby Osama's vocal style as "fluttering" and "sweet", her lyrics as "extremely melancholic", and her songs as "melodic". On Complex's list of rappers to watch in 2025, Nia Coats wrote that Baby Osama's music was a combination of "the sultriness of New York drill with the soul-baring lyrics of a 20-something caught between existential reflection and the pursuit of living in the moment". Anthony Seaman, writing in 2025 for Passion of the Weiss, described her style as "fearless" and called her "one of the most imaginative young rappers in the 5 boroughs".

== Discography ==
=== Studio albums ===
List of mixtapes, with release date and label shown
Title	Details
Enjoy the Ride	Released: May 16, 2025; Label: Cavity Records; Format: Digital download, streaming
Skidmarks	Released: November 27, 2025; Label: Cavity; Format: Digital download, streaming

=== Mixtapes ===
List of mixtapes, with release date and label shown
Title	Details
Sexc Summer	Released: July 12, 2024; Label: Cavity; Format: Digital download, streaming

=== Extended plays ===
List of mixtapes, with release date and label shown
Title	Details
Tank Girl	Released: June 2, 2023; Label: Cavity; Format: Digital download, streaming

=== Singles ===
List of singles as lead artist, showing year released and album name
Title	Year	Album
"HeadBuss"	2023	Non-album singles
"Move On O"	2023	Non-album singles
"Weird"	2023	Non-album singles
"No Label"	2023	Non-album singles
"Cut Me Off"	2023	Non-album singles
"Kill Bout Mine"	2023	Tank Girl
"Osama 4 President"	2023	Tank Girl
"AI"	2023	Tank Girl
"9 in My Draws"	2023	Non-album singles
"A Hunnit"	2023	Non-album singles
"End Up on the Island"	2023	Non-album singles
"On Hots"	2023	Non-album singles
"Used2Be"	2023	Non-album singles
"I Don't Mean It"	2024	Sexc Summer
"Free Max B"	2024	Sexc Summer
"Line Em Up"	2024	Sexc Summer
"You a Stepper" (with Vontee the Singer)	2024	Non-album singles
"Pacer Test"	2024	Non-album singles
"In & Out" (with Seddy Hendrinx, Lil Sccrt, and Nino Paid)	2024	Non-album singles
"Girls F Gurlz, Pt. 2" (with UnoTheActivist and Nvbeel)	2024	Non-album singles
"What's the Word"	2025	Enjoy the Ride
"Double D's"	2025	Enjoy the Ride
"See It Different"	2025	Enjoy the Ride
"I Gotta Go"	2025	Non-album single
