= Meet the Woo Tour =

Cancelled 2020 concert tour by Pop Smoke

- Tour by Pop Smoke
- Associated album: Meet the Woo and Meet the Woo 2
- Start date: March 2, 2020
- End date: April 16, 2020
- No. of shows: 25

The Meet the Woo Tour was scheduled to be the debut headlining concert tour by Pop Smoke. It was launched in support of his two mixtapes, Meet the Woo (2019) and Meet the Woo 2 (2020), and had been set to consist of concerts in North America and the United Kingdom. The tour was announced in January 2020, with dates being released at the same time. Pop Smoke later added more UK tour dates after high demand from fans.

Tour dates were released on the same day for North America, while dates for the United Kingdom were revealed in February. Due to high demand from fans, more tour dates for the UK were revealed on February 13, 2020. Pop Smoke shared a promotional flyer for the tour on social media. Pop Smoke and his team were planning on finishing, mixing, and mastering his debut studio album Shoot for the Stars, Aim for the Moon, starting the first week of March 2020.

In an interview with Revolt, Pop Smoke's DJ Jeffrey Archer talked about the tour. "Honestly, it's nothing planned yet. We just got those dates. This is officially going to be our first real big tour. This is going to be a month. I'm very excited about it. We're going to a few places we've never been to. We've been getting feedback over the last seven months [from] fans like, 'Please come out here.' There are loyal fans at these shows. You should expect a lot more music and shows. He has a lot of music coming out with a lot of artists. He's not playing. We're definitely shaking the room in 2020."

The tour was canceled after Pop Smoke was shot and killed. Fans were offered refunds after Pop Smoke's death: "As we mourn the loss of this great artist, refunds will be available at point of purchase."

== Canceled shows ==
List of canceled concerts, showing date, city, and country
Date (2020)	City	Country
March 2	Washington, D.C.	United States
March 4	Atlanta	United States
March 5	New Orleans	United States
March 7	Houston	United States
March 8	Dallas	United States
March 10	Scottsdale	United States
March 12	San Francisco	United States
March 13	Santa Ana	United States
March 15	Los Angeles	United States
March 16	Los Angeles	United States
March 18	Albuquerque	United States
March 19	Denver	United States
March 21	Chicago	United States
March 22	Milwaukee	United States
March 23	Detroit	United States
March 24	Toronto	Canada
March 26	Pawtucket	United States
March 27	New Haven	United States
March 29	Boston	United States
March 30	Boston	United States
March 31	Philadelphia	United States
April 13	Birmingham	United Kingdom
April 14	Manchester	United Kingdom
April 15	London	United Kingdom
April 16	London	United Kingdom
