= War (Pop Smoke song) =

Single by Pop Smoke featuring Lil Tjay

Single by Pop Smoke featuring Lil Tjay
- Released: October 4, 2019
- Genre: Drill; hip hop
- Length: 3:43
- Label: Victor Victor; Republic
- Songwriters: Bashar Jackson; Tione Merritt; Andre Loblack; Ellis Newton
- Producers: 808Melo; Swirv

Pop Smoke singles chronology
| "Flexin" (2019) | "War" (2019) | "Fire in the Booth, Pt. 1" (2019) |

Lil Tjay singles chronology
| "Hold On" (2019) | "War" (2019) | "Go In" (2020) |

"War" is a song by American rapper Pop Smoke featuring American rapper Lil Tjay. Written alongside producers 808Melo and Swirv, It was released by Victor Victor Worldwide and Republic Records as a standalone single on October 4, 2019. The song was later included as a bonus track on Pop Smoke's second mixtape, Meet the Woo 2 (2020). A drill and hip hop track, "War" sees Pop Smoke and Lil Tjay rap about intimidating people in the streets of New York.

The song received positive reviews from music critics, with a number of them praising the lyrics. It peaked at number 100 on the Canadian Hot 100, and was certified Silver by the British Phonographic Industry (BPI) for equivalent sales of 200,000 units in the United Kingdom. A music video for the song was released on October 28, 2019, and was directed by JLShotThat. It features Pop Smoke and Lil Tjay rapping in a big mansion, riding on street bikes, performing live, and interrupting a show.

== Background and composition ==
The song was written by Pop Smoke, known as Bashar Jackson, alongside Lil Tjay, known as Tione Merritt, Ellis Newton, known as Swirv, and 808Melo, known as Andre Loblack. 808Melo handled the song's production and programming. Colin Leonard mastered the song, while Fabian Marasciullo handled mixing alongside Thomas McLaren, who was credited as an assistant mixer. "War" was released as a standalone single by Victor Victor Worldwide and Republic Records on October 4, 2019. It was later added as a bonus track on Pop Smoke's second mixtape Meet the Woo 2 on February 7, 2020.

Musically, "War" is a drill and hip hop song. Writing for Billboard magazine, Michael Saponara stated that the song has Pop Smoke rap with "croaky rhymes", that are mixed with Lil Tjay's "high-pitched croon". He continued, saying Pop Smoke "stays intimidating to his detractors by calmly saying one call can have them disposed of". Naimah Archibald-Powell of GRM Daily commented that the song "houses Pop Smoke's unique ad-libs, a catchy chorus and assertive bars". Kemet High of XXL magazine stated that "on the sub side of the beat, Lil Tjay uses his voice to coat the foundation with an intoxicating hum. And on the surface, the timing of his bars is supreme and broken just enough to allow himself to come up for air before he dives back in".

== Reception ==
"War" has been met with mainly positive reviews from music critics. Writing for Spin magazine, Emily Tan called the song a "stream-worthy single". The staff of XXL magazine described the song as "ominous". Aron A. of HotNewHipHop stated that "Pop Smoke's deep, raspy voice contrasts Lil Tjay's more honeyed melodies", and said it "keeps things exciting throughout the track". Saponara praised the song, saying Pop Smoke "stays war-ready", while opining that his chemistry with Lil Tjay "makes for an explosive combination". Dhruva Balram of NME said that "Pop [Smoke's] croak perfectly complements Lil Tjay's rapid-fire rhymes, making for a frenzied combination". Shamira Ibrahim of Vulture opined Lil Tjay's "trajectory has been nothing short or an astronomical climb" because of the song. After Pop Smoke was murdered at the age of 20, "War" debuted at number 100 on the Canadian Hot 100 for the issue dated March 6, 2020, and lasted one week on the chart.

== Music video ==
A music video for "War" was released on October 28, 2019, and was directed by JLShotThat. The visual was shot in black and white, with it featuring Pop Smoke and Lil Tjay rapping their verses in a huge mansion, as scenes switch between them on street bikes, performing live, and shutting down a show. Torsten Ingvaldsen of Hypebeast mentioned the visual is "lightly edited", and commented that its "only hint of color are the various flame details that mark transitions throughout". Archibald-Powell opined that the video is "sweet and simple".

== Credits and personnel ==
Credits adapted from Tidal.

- Bashar Jackson – vocals, songwriter
- Tione Merritt – vocals, songwriter
- Andre Loblack – producer, songwriter, programming
- Ellis Newton – songwriter
- Colin Leonard – mastering engineer
- Fabian Marasciullo – mixing engineer
- Thomas McLaren – assistant mixing engineer

== Charts ==
Weekly chart performance for "War"
| Chart (2020) | Peak position |
|---|---|
| Canada Hot 100 (Billboard) | 100 |

== Certifications ==
Certifications for "War"
| Region | Certification | Certified units/sales |
|---|---|---|
| United Kingdom (BPI) | Silver | 200,000^{‡} |
^{‡} Sales+streaming figures based on certification alone.
