= Dior (Pop Smoke song) =

2020 single by Pop Smoke

Single by Pop Smoke

from the album Meet the Woo
- Released: February 11, 2020
- Recorded: 2019
- Genre: Drill; hip hop
- Length: 3:36
- Label: Victor Victor; Republic
- Songwriters: Bashar Jackson; Andre Loblack
- Producer: 808Melo

Pop Smoke singles chronology
"Slide (Remix)" (2019)	"Dior" (2020)	"Ordinary" (2020)

Music video
- "Dior" on YouTube

"Dior" is a song by American rapper Pop Smoke, originally released on July 26, 2019, by Victor Victor Worldwide and Republic Records as a track from his debut mixtape Meet the Woo (2019). A drill and hip hop song, it was written by Pop Smoke alongside producer 808Melo, and was issued as the third and final single from the tape on February 11, 2020. "Dior" was later added to Pop Smoke's second mixtape Meet the Woo 2, along with a remix featuring fellow American rapper Gunna. The solo version appeared again on Pop Smoke's posthumous debut studio album Shoot for the Stars, Aim for the Moon (2020), then finally once more on the deluxe edition of its follow-up Faith (2021). It has been included on all four of Pop Smoke's commercially released projects and is considered to be his signature song.

In the song's lyrics, Pop Smoke raps about flirting with women and buying the latest designer clothes. "Dior" received widespread critical acclaim from critics, many of whom deemed it a New York anthem and his signature song. The song was nominated for Best Rap Performance at the 63rd Annual Grammy Awards. Shortly after Pop Smoke's death on February 19, 2020, the single peaked at number 22 on the US Billboard Hot 100 and number 33 on the UK Singles Chart. "Dior" peaked in the top 60 of record charts in ten other countries, including Greece, where it reached number six while charting for over 150 weeks. The single also received several certifications, including a triple-platinum certification in the US by the Recording Industry Association of America (RIAA).

JLShotThat directed the music video for "Dior", which depicts Pop Smoke dancing with a group of people in a parking lot and at a strip club. Pop Smoke performed the song for VevoDSCVR and Rolling Loud in 2019. In the wake of the murder of George Floyd and the ensuing civil unrest, the song became a prominent anti-police brutality protest anthem.

== Background and release ==
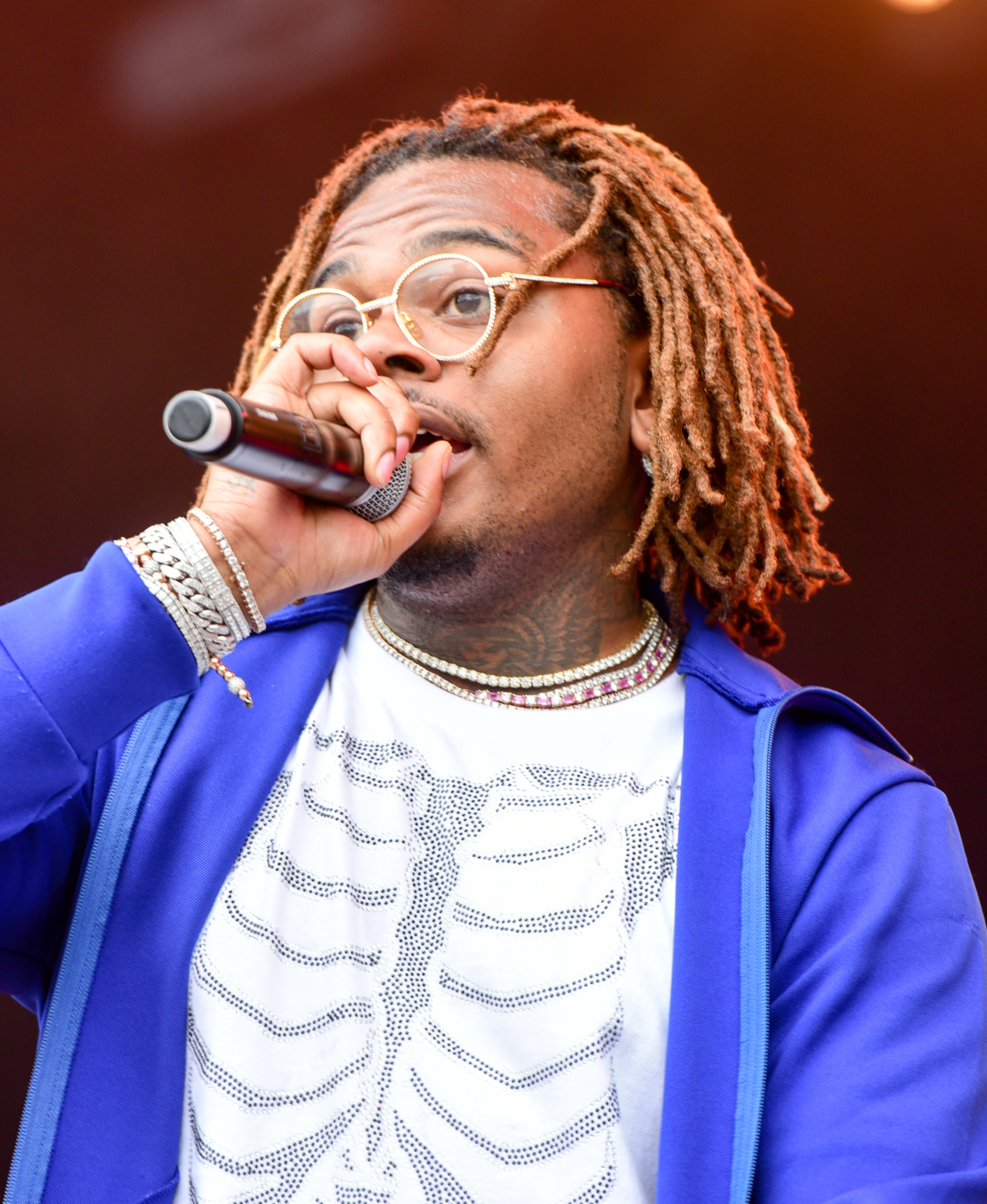
American rapper Gunna (pictured in 2019) is featured on the remix of "Dior".

American rapper Pop Smoke first showed "Dior" to record executive Steven Victor. Victor felt that the song was interesting, but did not think it would be successful; when a colleague listened to it, they then had the impression the song would be one of Pop Smoke's biggest hits. He listened to the song again and realized how he enjoyed the song's hook. Victor took the song to Republic Records and wanted it to be Pop Smoke's next single from his mixtape Meet the Woo (2019). Victor wanted Pop Smoke to be a global artist and decided to have him perform a promo tour in specifically targeted cities, starting in London, UK, and continuing to cities where the song was becoming popular. He started showcasing "Dior" through several New York radio stations; he and two of his friends started to work on the song and sent it to DJs around the US to play.

In November 2020, Pop Smoke's brother Obasi Jackson showed an unreleased version of "Dior" on an Instagram livestream and played unreleased lyrics from the song. This scrapped verse was later repurposed for the posthumous track “Bad Boys” on Pop Smoke's second studio album Faith (2021). "Dior" was originally released as the sixth track on Pop Smoke's debut mixtape Meet the Woo, on July 26, 2019. It was later sent to American rhythmic contemporary radio as the mixtape's third and final single on February 11, 2020, and then added as a bonus track to Pop Smoke's second mixtape Meet the Woo 2 (2020) and posthumous debut studio album Shoot for the Stars, Aim for the Moon (2020). A remix of the song featuring American rapper Gunna was released on the deluxe edition of Meet the Woo 2, released on February 12, 2020. The song was later added on the deluxe edition of Pop Smoke's second album Faith (2021).

== Composition and lyrics ==
Pop Smoke co-wrote "Dior" with 808Melo. 808Melo produced and programmed the song. Jack Baxter and Vic Wainstein were the song's recording engineers; and Jaycen Joshua, DJ Riggins, and Mike Seaberg mixed the song with assistant mixer Jacob Richards. "Dior" is a drill and hip hop song with production that makes use of a bass wobble, Hi-hat, and violin sample that is reversed and chopped up. August Brown of the Los Angeles Times pointed out the lines "Tell my shooters call me FaceTime/For all the time we had to face time" are about gun-play. Alphonse Pierre from Pitchfork said the song is about the frustration of seeing a friend being jailed, the fun of flirting and buying fashionable clothes, and the "sobering reality" of knowing it could end unexpectedly. In the words of The Buffalo News' Abby Monteil, Pop Smoke shows his love for buying his girlfriend expensive gifts from brands like Dior, while Heran Mamo from Billboard magazine wrote that Pop Smoke boasts about the finer things in life he can buy. For the song's remix, Anthony Malone, writing for HipHopDX, stated that Gunna raps about "his favorite denim jeans from Mike Amiri, Ricky Owens and Valentino. He also mentions his favorite sports cars and designer watches".

== Critical reception ==
"Dior" was met with critical acclaim by critics, being lauded as a genre defining Brooklyn drill song. Uproxx's Wongo Okon cited it as the standout track of Meet the Woo. David Aaron Brake of HipHopDX considered the song a "classic", Paper's Bianca Gracie called it a "head-rushing hit". Critic Erin Lowers of Exclaim! described the track as fresh and said it is "the power of short and sweet". In The New York Times, Nicole Hong deemed "Dior" a "radio staple". Julyssa Lopez of The New Yorker commended the song's "roaring, rallying spirit".

Some reviewers believed "Dior" displayed Pop Smoke's personality. Billboard critic Michael Saponara labeled the song an "instant party-starter", and declared it embodies "exactly what made Pop Smoke special". Charles Lyons-Burt from Slant Magazine said Pop Smoke channels "his untamed aggression into repetitive, elemental lyrics that were colored by his force of personality". Writing for AllMusic, Fred Thomas opined Pop Smoke throws bars effortlessly and rides an "explosive beat typical to the blunt" and praised its aggressive feel that "flows through the entire mixtape".

Several music critics praised "Dior" as an anthem. Variety's A. D. Amorosi described the song as a "taut and tension-filled anthem", writing that it sounds raucous and sinister. Craig Jenkins of Vulture said it was a "classic Big Apple party anthem", and Essence's Brooklyn White referred to "Welcome to the Party", "Dior", and "Shake the Room" as anthems for Brooklyn. San Francisco Chronicle critic Robert Spuhler wrote the song was one of Pop Smoke's signature songs and said it was inescapable in New York during 2019. NPR's Briana Younger lauded it as an "artifact of the New York summer".

In November 2020, "Dior" received a nomination for Best Rap Performance at the 63rd Annual Grammy Awards. Steven Victor told GQ the nomination was not important and stated "Dior" should have been nominated in more than one category.

== Commercial performance ==
In the United States, “Dior” was a sleeper hit, having reached its peak on the US Billboard Hot 100 roughly an entire year after its initial release. After Pop Smoke was murdered at the age of 20 in a home invasion, "Dior" debuted at number 49 on the US Billboard Hot 100 based on 12 million streams in the week ending February 20, 2020. It became Pop Smoke's first solo and posthumous Hot 100 hit after collaborating with JackBoys and Travis Scott on "Gatti", which debuted and peaked at number 69 in January 2020. "Dior" then rose to number 30 on the chart dated March 7, 2020. Following the release of Shoot for the Stars, Aim for the Moon, "Dior" peaked at number 22 on the Hot 100. The song reached the top 30 on the US Hot R&B/Hip-Hop Songs and Rhythmic charts. In May 2020, the Recording Industry Association of America (RIAA) certified "Dior" platinum for selling 1,000,000 certified units, making it Pop Smoke's first song to gain a platinum certification in the United States.

In the United Kingdom, "Dior" debuted at number 73 on the UK Singles Chart dated February 21, 2020. After Pop Smoke's death, "Dior" rose 40 places to number 33 on the chart dated February 28, 2020, giving the rapper his first top-40 hit in the UK. The song was later certified double platinum by the British Phonographic Industry (BPI), denoting track-equivalent sales and streams of 1,200,000 units in the UK. In Australia, "Dior" peaked at number 48 on the ARIA Singles Chart after the release of Shoot for the Stars, Aim for the Moon, and was certified gold by the Australian Recording Industry Association (ARIA) for shipments of over 35,000 copies The song was later certified triple-platinum by the RIAA for sales and streams of over 3,000,000 units in the US. The song peaked within the top 60 of record charts in Canada, Denmark, France, Germany, Iceland, Ireland, New Zealand, and Portugal. The song was most successful in Greece, peaking at number six.

== Promotion and legacy ==
A music video for "Dior" was released on September 3, 2019, and was directed, produced, and edited by JLShotThat. It features Pop Smoke and a group of men and women dancing to the track in a strip club and in a nearby parking lot. The rapper is also seen throwing cash in the air. Toward the end of the video, the group are interrupted by distant gunfire and the video closes with a single thundering gunshot before cutting to black.

In October 2019, Pop Smoke performed "Dior" live on MTV's Total Request Live offshoot program Fresh Out Friday. A month later, he performed the song for VevoDSCVR, a platform showcasing emerging young artists. Later in December, he performed the song live at a Rolling Loud concert in Los Angeles, California. In February of the next year, shortly after his death, the Yard Club in Paris, France, debuted an on-stage hologram of Pop Smoke that virtually performed "Dior".

After Pop Smoke's murder on February 19, 2020, fans gathered in his hometown Canarsie, Brooklyn, in March 2020 and sang the lyrics of "Dior" and his other songs. In June 2020, "Dior" became an anthem for the Black Lives Matter movement. Although the song is not about police brutality or racism, it became a popular anthem that was used as a symbol of resistance during the George Floyd protests. Shamira Ibrahim of Nylon stated "Dior" was juxtaposed against a backdrop of burning police cars and groups of protesters marching down Eastern Parkway. She said the track had the "coalescence of energy [that] feels nearly elemental". Alphonse Pierre of Pitchfork said the song does not sound "quite like those other songs" and concluded by saying "Dior" was never intended to be part of the moment but that it was "unifying and energizing" the protests. Paste's Jade Gomez wrote that the song had "taken on a new meaning of protest". Writing for GQ, Paul Thompson opined "Dior" was a strange fit for the protest movement but was "nonetheless appropriate".

== In popular culture ==
In early 2020, "Dior" began trending on the video-sharing social networking service TikTok. At the 2020 BET Hip Hop Awards, the song's instrumental section was used to honor Pop Smoke. The performance featured rappers Flo Milli, Buddy, Deante' Hitchcock, and Adé rapping over the track's beat.

After gaining popularity worldwide, the song was remixed by many international artists including Ghanaian rapper Kwesi Arthur, Jamaican dancehall artist Skillibeng, Nigerian singer Ladipoe, and UK drill rappers Skeng and Perm. In particular, IDPizzle's "Dior" cover, titled "Billie Jin (Dior Remix)", became a viral success after being featured on the app Triller. Within a month, the remix had attracted the attention of UMG/Virgin UK, and IDPizzle announced had signed a recording contract with the label. The official remix of "Dior" features American rapper Gunna and was included on the deluxe edition of Pop Smoke's second mixtape Meet the Woo 2. The "Dior" remix was ranked the third-best song of 2020 up to July by The Ringer, and Tidal included Gunna's verse on its year-end playlist for the best guest verses of 2020.

== Credits and personnel ==
Credits and personnel for "Dior" adapted from Tidal.

- Bashar Jackson – songwriter, vocals (Note: Pop Smoke is credited under his real name Bashar Jackson.)
- 808Melo – producer, songwriter, programmer
- Vic Wainstein – recording engineer
- Jack Baxter – recording engineer
- Jaycen Joshua – mixer
- DJ Riggins – assistant mixer
- Mike Seaberg – assistant mixer
- Jacob Richards – assistant mixer

== Charts ==
=== Weekly charts ===
Weekly chart performance for "Dior"
Chart (2020)	Peak position
Australia (ARIA)	48
Austria (Ö3 Austria Top 40)	61
Belgium (Ultratip Bubbling Under Flanders)	20
Belgium (Ultratip Bubbling Under Wallonia)	30
Canada Hot 100 (Billboard)	28
Denmark (Tracklisten)	39
France (SNEP)	48
Germany (GfK)	59
Global 200 (Billboard)	61
Greece International (IFPI)	6
Iceland (Tónlistinn)	30
Ireland (IRMA)	26
Netherlands (Single Top 100)	64
New Zealand (RMNZ)	38
Portugal (AFP)	57
Slovakia (Singles Digitál Top 100)	98
Sweden (Sverigetopplistan)	53
Switzerland (Schweizer Hitparade)	42
UK Singles (Official Charts)	33
US Billboard Hot 100	22
US Hot R&B/Hip-Hop Songs (Billboard)	12
US Rhythmic Airplay (Billboard)	28
US Rolling Stone Top 100	12

=== Year-end charts ===
2020 year-end chart positions for "Dior"
Chart (2020)	Position
Canada (Canadian Hot 100)	76
Denmark (Tracklisten)	90
France (SNEP)	84
Switzerland (Schweizer Hitparade)	74
UK Singles (OCC)	86
US Billboard Hot 100	83
US Hot R&B/Hip-Hop Songs (Billboard)	39

2021 year-end chart positions for "Dior"
Chart (2021)	Position
France (SNEP)	128
Global 200 (Billboard)	122
Portugal (AFP)	173

== Certifications ==
Certifications and sales for "Dior"
Region	Certification	Certified units/sales
Australia (ARIA)	Platinum	70,000^{‡}
Brazil (Pro-Música Brasil)	Platinum	40,000^{‡}
Denmark (IFPI Danmark)	2× Platinum	180,000^{‡}
France (SNEP)	Diamond	333,333^{‡}
Germany (BVMI)	Platinum	400,000^{‡}
Italy (FIMI)	Platinum	70,000^{‡}
New Zealand (RMNZ)	Gold	15,000^{‡}
Poland (ZPAV)	2× Platinum	100,000^{‡}
Portugal (AFP)	Platinum	10,000^{‡}
Spain (Promusicae)	Gold	30,000^{‡}
United Kingdom (BPI)	2× Platinum	1,200,000^{‡}
United States (RIAA)	3× Platinum	3,000,000^{‡}
Streaming
Greece (IFPI Greece)	3× Platinum	6,000,000^{†}
Sweden (GLF)	Platinum	8,000,000^{†}
^{‡} Sales+streaming figures based on certification alone.^{†} Streaming-only figures based on certification alone.
