= Gatti (song) =

2019 song by JackBoys, Travis Scott, and Pop Smoke

Song by JackBoys, Travis Scott and Pop Smoke

from the album JackBoys
- Released: December 27, 2019
- Recorded: 2019
- Genre: Drill
- Length: 3:01
- Label: Epic; Cactus Jack
- Songwriters: Bashar Jackson; Jacques Webster II; Andre Loblack; Peter Klapka; Abdul-aziz Manalla Yusuf
- Producers: 808Melo; Axl (co.)

Music video
- "Gatti" on YouTube

"Gatti" is a song released by American record label Cactus Jack Records, known as hip-hop group JackBoys, performed by American rappers Travis Scott (JackBoys' leader) and Pop Smoke from the former two's compilation album, JackBoys (2019). The song was written by the rappers alongside Peter Klapka, producer 808Melo, and co-producer Axl. A drill song, it sees Travis Scott rap about American model Kylie Jenner and why they broke up. Many critics lauded Pop Smoke's inclusion in the song.

"Gatti" peaked at number 69 on the US Billboard Hot 100, giving Pop Smoke his first Hot 100 hit in the United States. It also reached the top-70 of record charts in Canada and the United Kingdom. An accompanying music video was released on December 30, 2019, and directed by Cactus Jack and White Trash Tyler. The visual features Travis Scott driving around New York's streets in a black and blue Bugatti Chiron while Pop Smoke is sat in the passenger seat. The video received positive reviews, with some critics praising its usage of the Bugatti Chiron.

== Background and release ==
In March 2017, Travis Scott announced he would be launching his own imprint, under the name of Cactus Jack Records. On November 29, 2019, Travis Scott released JackBoys merchandise on his website. Travis Scott enlisted the help of fellow rapper Pop Smoke to be on the track "Gatti". The song was written by Travis Scott, Pop Smoke, 808Melo, Axl, and Peter Klapka, while 808Melo handled its production and while Axl was credited as a co-producer. The song was released as the seventh and last track from Travis Scott and Jackboy's compilation album JackBoys, on December 27, 2019. It was later added as a bonus track on the Target edition of Pop Smoke's second mixtape Meet the Woo 2 (2020).

== Music and lyrics ==
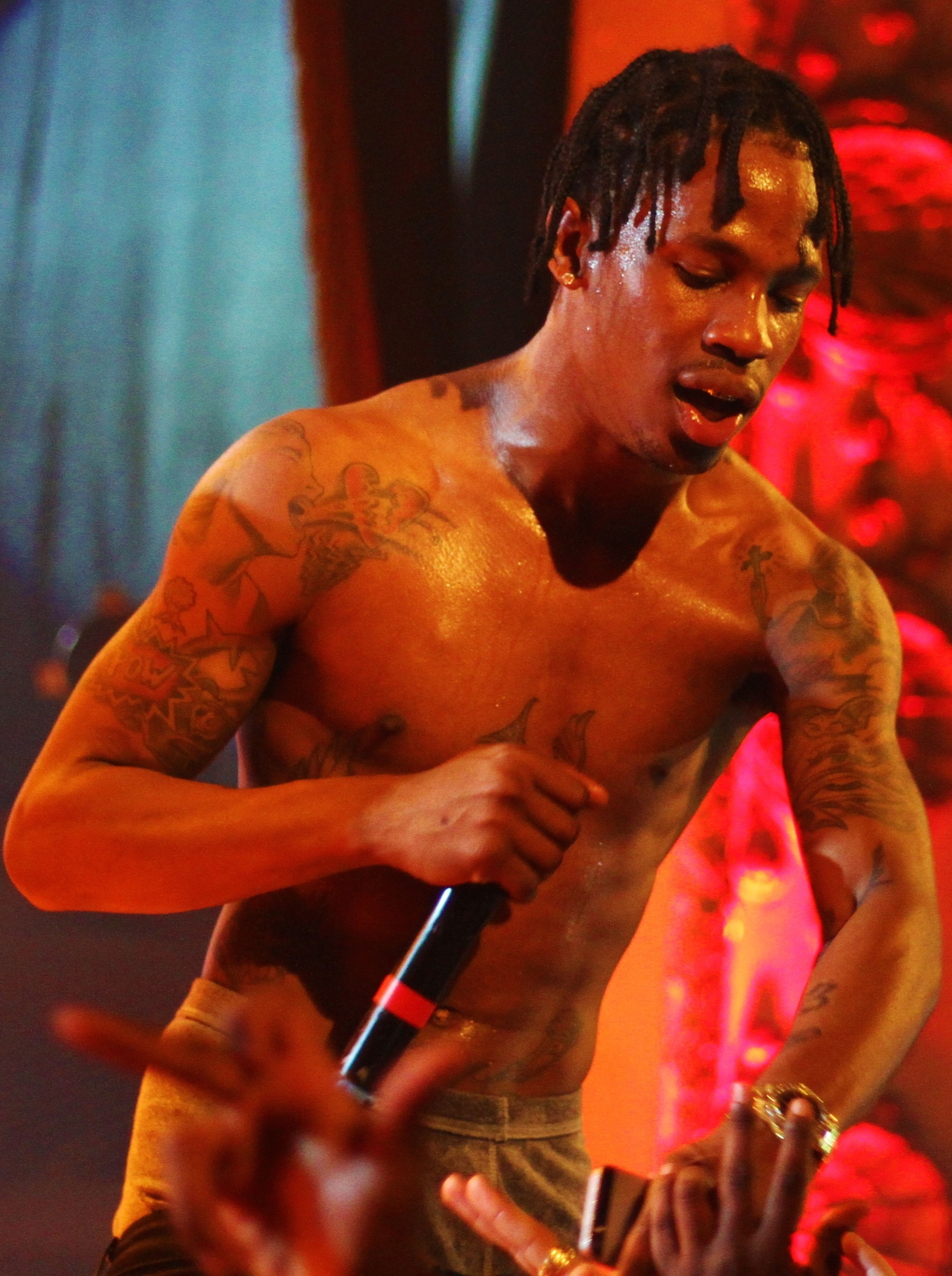
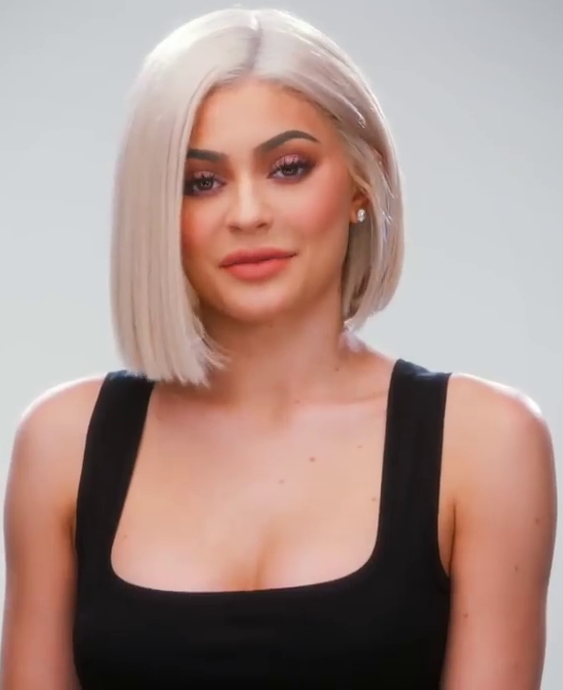
Many publications believed that Travis Scott (left) raps about his ex-girlfriend Kylie Jenner (right) and why they broke up.

Musically, "Gatti" is a drill song. Ryan Reed of Rolling Stone commented that the track is a "woozy, percussive song". Pop Smoke delivers a few "okay, okay" and "woo" adlibs. Travis Scott raps: "Duck away, she wanna lay up and hibernate/I took a chance, it's a lot to take." Many writers considered that the lyrics allude to his former girlfriend Kylie Jenner and why they broke up. Jess Cohen of E! Online stated "Travis' lyrics could be noting Kylie's chose to 'hibernate' while he's busy performing all over the world". Carolyn Twersky of Seventeen commented that the lyrics are "most likely about Kylie and her expensive taste".

Jessica Vacco-Bolaños for Elite Daily said the song's lyrics may "suggest that Jenner (a known homebody) wanted to settle down, while Scott was not quite ready". InStyle's Alicia Brunker opined the song is "referring to the former couple's different lifestyles which is rumored to have caused them to call it quits". Dusty Baxter-Wright of Cosmopolitan depicted that Travis Scott references the rumors "Kylie wanted to settle down and get married, while he wasn't ready yet". Milly Haddrick of Girlfriend noted it seems like Travis Scott is "referring to Kylie wanting to stay at home, whereas his lifestyle as a musician means he constantly has to be on the road touring". She continued, saying the second part of the lyrics "seem to be hinting at how Kylie demands a lot in a relationship, specifically expensive gifts".

== Critical reception ==
Fred Thomas of AllMusic described "Gatti" as a "bravado-heavy banger". Writing for Billboard magazine, Michael Saponara wrote Pop Smoke and Travis Scott "prove to be a winning combination as [Travis Scott] invades the drill beat". Dhruva Balram of NME opined that Pop Smoke "outshines all his cohorts and it's no wonder he gets most of the spotlight, with [Travis Scott]'s verse reduced to a mere after-thought". Aron A. for HotNewHipHop said it "undoubtedly reached the high expectations set for the song". Jon Caramanica from The New York Times described the song as "menacing but surprisingly fleet, a crucial balance that satisfies both ground-level fans and those peering in from outside".

In a less enthusiastic review, Sheldon Pearce of Pitchfork stated the song "sounds like diet "Welcome to the Party" and drill isn't the kind of subgenre where you’re looking to cut calories". Kevin Cortez of HipHopDX called the track a "confusing choice of a closer track" and said it has "a hurried, yet bland drill beat". He continues, saying Pop Smoke's "grizzly voice soars over a beat that sounds fit for his trigger-happy lyrics, but not his delivery". He concludes, mentioning Travis Scott "hops on the song's latter half and doesn't do much to add any flavor to the already muted production".

== Commercial performance ==
Following the release of Jackboys, "Gatti" debuted and peaked at number 69 on the US Billboard Hot 100, giving Pop Smoke his first Hot 100 hit in the United States. It also peaked at number 33 on the US Billboard Hot R&B/Hip-Hop Songs chart. The song debuted at number 59 on the UK Singles Chart, giving Pop Smoke his first top 100 hit in the United Kingdom. "Gatti" further peaked at number 61 in Canada, and number 175 in France.

== Music video ==
=== Background and synopsis ===
A music video for "Gatti" was released on December 30, 2019. The video was directed by Cactus Jack and White Trash Tyler. Reed mentioned that the video is an "NSFW visual with disorienting touches: a series of choppy editing effects, slow motion sequences and an eerie blue light", while Joe Price of Complex stated it has a "suitably dark and lo-fi aesthetic". The visual features Travis Scott driving around the streets of New York in a black and blue Bugatti Chiron, with Pop Smoke sitting in the passenger seat. Pop Smoke takes up most of the visual, dancing and rapping his verse, while Travis Scott drives them to get something to eat in a McDonald's parking lot. Travis Scott does not show up in the video very much, but instead shows quick glimpses of a lady dancing on a pole and twerking.

=== Critical reception ===
The music video was met with positive reviews from critics. Writing for The Fader, David Renshaw described the video as "glossy". Trey Alston of MTV lauded the car as "absolutely stunning", saying "[y]ou could watch [the video] all day just for the scenes of this blue-and-black beauty and its lush interior". He continued, opining that Pop Smoke sounded like if "Darth Vader became an emcee". In his review for Uproxx, Aaron Williams said the "small fleet of Bugatti sports cars pulling up in a McDonald's drive-thru makes for a striking image and reinforces the hood-rich sensibility of the song's lyrics". Carl Lamarre of Billboard magazine commented that the "fiery tandem" of Pop Smoke and Travis Scott "bring their frenetic energy into the streets of New York". The staff of GRM Daily noted the video "sticks with the action-packed theme of the previous drops; projecting junkyard car crews, Bugatti's and jittery animation".

== Credits and personnel ==
Credits adapted from Tidal.

- Travis Scott – vocals, songwriter
- Pop Smoke – vocals, songwriter
- 808Melo – production, songwriter
- AXL Beats – co-production, songwriter
- Peter Klapka – songwriter
- Mike Dean – mastering engineer, mixing engineer
- Nate Alford – recording engineer
- Erin Duran – A&R coordinator
- Oggizery Los – A&R director
- Sickamore – A&R director

== Charts ==
Chart performance for "Gatti"
Chart (2020)	Peak position
Canada Hot 100 (Billboard)	61
France (SNEP)	175
UK Singles (OCC)	59
US Billboard Hot 100	69
US Hot R&B/Hip-Hop Songs (Billboard)	33

== Certifications ==
Certifications for "Gatti"
Region	Certification	Certified units/sales
Canada (Music Canada)	Platinum	80,000^{‡}
Denmark (IFPI Danmark)	Gold	45,000^{‡}
France (SNEP)	Gold	100,000^{‡}
Italy (FIMI)	Gold	50,000^{‡}
New Zealand (RMNZ)	Platinum	30,000^{‡}
Poland (ZPAV)	Platinum	50,000^{‡}
United Kingdom (BPI)	Silver	200,000^{‡}
United States (RIAA)	2× Platinum	2,000,000^{‡}
Streaming
Greece (IFPI Greece)	Gold	1,000,000^{†}
^{‡} Sales+streaming figures based on certification alone.^{†} Streaming-only figures based on certification alone.
