= Brooklyn drill =

Subgenre of drill music

- Other names: BK drill
- Stylistic origins: Drill; UK drill; East Coast hip-hop; gangsta rap
- Cultural origins: Early 2010s, Brooklyn, New York City, U.S.

Subgenres
- Bronx drill

Fusion genres
- Jersey club rap

Brooklyn drill is a regional subgenre of drill music, which is a subgenre of hip-hop music. It centered in Brooklyn, that began as derivative of the drill music scene in Chicago and later became derivative of UK drill with its 808 percussion and sliding notes by producers from the UK drill scene. Brooklyn drill emerged around 2014 with the single "Hot Nigga" from the rapper Bobby Shmurda. Other early contributors were Rowdy Rebel, Envy Caine, Jezz Gasoline, Bam Bino, Money Millz, Dah Dah and Curly Savv.

In 2019, the subgenre was repopularized in the mainstream by American rapper Pop Smoke. With the success of his mixtapes, particularly the songs "Dior" and "Welcome to the Party", Pop Smoke introduced Brooklyn drill into the mainstream music industry.

== History ==
Brooklyn drill music first gained attention with the 2014 single "Hot Nigga" from the rapper Bobby Shmurda. Other early pioneers were rappers Bam Bino, Dah Dah and Curly Savv. The genre is agreed to have been driven by 22Gz and Sheff G, largely scaling the potential of the movement. The music became more popular and associated with UK drill production (from producers such as 808Melo, AXL Beats, and Ghosty) with the releases of 22Gz's "Suburban" in 2016 and Sheff G's "No Suburban" in 2017. Both songs went viral and were credited for the rise of Brooklyn drill.

Brooklyn drill music reached mainstream Billboard Hot 100 success with tracks from Pop Smoke ("Welcome to the Party", "Dior", and "Gatti") and Fivio Foreign ("Big Drip" and "Demons"). Pop Smoke was nominated for a 2021 Grammy Award for "Dior." After Pop Smoke's 2020 murder in the Hollywood Hills, Brooklyn drill would continue to evolve. With the groundwork Pop Smoke laid, the broader drill scene of Brooklyn began to emerge. One example is Staten Island rapper CJ, whose hit song "Whoopty" is reminiscent of the Brooklyn drill sound.

== Characteristics ==
The Brooklyn drill sound is a combination of trap, Chicago drill and UK drill (the latter of which brings production influences from grime and UK garage). Characteristic features of Brooklyn drill production include distorted 808 percussions with vocal sampling from other popular tracks. Brooklyn drill lyrics tend to be dark, violent, and street-oriented, often discussing gang-related topics.

== Criticism ==
In 2022, some drew connections between the glorification of gun violence in the genre to real-world gun violence on the streets of New York that had resulted in the deaths of a number of young drill artists, mostly those with origins of Brooklyn and the Bronx.

The same year, several prominent New York DJs said they would stop playing gang/diss records in response to the deaths of a growing number of young people involved in the drill scene.

In February 2022, NYC mayor Eric Adams directed some venue promoters not to allow drill music to be performed at festivals in the city following the killing of 18-year-old rapper C-HII Wvttz. Adams met with musicians for a conversation on how to approach concerns about drill culture's connections, if any, to gun violence. Artists at the meeting included Maino, Fivio Foreign, B-Lovee, CEO Slow, Bucksy Luciano and Bleezy.

== Bronx drill ==
Bronx drill
- Other names: BX drill; sample drill
- Stylistic origins: Drill; Brooklyn drill; soul; funk; contemporary R&B; pop; East Coast hip-hop
- Cultural origins: early 2020s, The Bronx, New York City, U.S.

Subgenres
- Sexy drill

Bronx drill is a subgenre of Brooklyn drill music, which uses uncleared samples of older records instead of synthesizers like in Brooklyn drill.

Bronx drill originated during the early 2020s in New York (most prominently, in The Bronx), where producers such as Cash Cobain, EPondabeat, WAR, Elvis Beatz, Yozora and others, started re-using older funk and soul, and pop songs to create a modern yet nostalgic sound. A number of rappers subsequently joined the scene, most prominently, Kay Flock, B-Lovee, Ron Suno, DThang Gz, Jay5ive and others.

The easily recognizable samples in Bronx drill are also said to increase its viral potential. Songs, such as B-Lovee's "My Everything" (sampling "Everything" by Mary J. Blige) gained over 400,000 uses on TikTok and produced two remixes, featuring A Boogie wit da Hoodie and G Herbo. Another early TikTok viral Bronx drill hit was "Deep End Freestyle" (sampling Fousheé's "Deep End") by Brooklyn native Sleepy Hallow. Despite playing a huge role in genre's spread, Cash Cobain refused to acknowledge that Bronx drill musicians mostly do songs for TikTok. EPondabeat, another producer involved in the scene, claimed that sampling in used for marketing purpose to invoke listener's relatability.

Bronx drill rappers employ a variety of lyrical delivery styles, with those in the Bronx drill scene using a particularly aggressive style. "These little kids from the Bronx are wild. They on demon time. They're angrier with their shit," one producer said.

Samples for Bronx drill come from a variety of sources and these sources may differ depending on producer. Bronx-based Cash Cobain mainly uses round-the-century contemporary R&B and hip hop music sources; meanwhile, EPondabeat, EvilGiane prefer to use soul and funk recordings for sampling; other producers, such as WAR, do not limit themselves among sampling sources.

Most Bronx drill songs are not granted clearance to sample other works until they've already gained popularity, with some artists saying they don't care to clear their samples at all.

Bronx drill, since its inception around 2020, already had a mainstream crossover, when Cardi B performed on "Shake It" by Kay Flock. Bronx drill has also influenced by Jersey drill sound and more commercial drill sound, most particularly the influence can be heard on B.I.B.L.E. by Fivio Foreign, where he sampled "Say My Name" by Destiny's Child.

The Bronx producer Cash Cobain has been described by Complex Music as inventing sexy drill which tones down the violent nature of drill, while still drawing on the sampling techniques. Cobain said, "I think everybody wants to feel good, party, and just feel sexy". Complex wrote that Cobain is "changing the sound of New York".

Ice Spice and Kenzo B emerged from the Bronx drill scene.
