= Meet the Woo 2 =

Mixtape by Pop Smoke
- Released: February 7, 2020
- Genres: Hip-hop; electronic; drill
- Length: 45:00
- Labels: Victor Victor; Republic
- Producers: 808MeloBeats; Axl; CashMoneyAP; CZR Beats; Dez Wright; Falconi; Juju on da Beat; Jurij; Othello Beats; Rico Beats; Swirving; WondaGurl; Yamaica; Yoz Beatz

Pop Smoke chronology
Meet the Woo (2019)	Meet the Woo 2 (2020)	Shoot for the Stars, Aim for the Moon (2020)

Singles from Meet the Woo 2
- 1. "Christopher Walking" Released: January 16, 2020; 2. "Shake the Room" Released: March 28, 2020

Meet the Woo 2 (alternatively titled Meet the Woo, Vol. 2) is the second and final mixtape by American rapper Pop Smoke. Released by Victor Victor Worldwide and Republic Records on February 7, 2020, it is the second installment in the Meet the Woo mixtape series, following Meet the Woo (2019). The deluxe edition of the mixtape, released on February 12, 2020, features three new tracks, including a remix of "Dior" featuring American rapper Gunna. On February 19, 2020, less than two weeks after the release of the standard edition of Meet the Woo 2, Pop Smoke was shot and killed at age 20 during a home invasion, making Meet the Woo 2 the last project by Pop Smoke to be released during his lifetime. Guest appearances on the mixtape include Quavo, A Boogie wit da Hoodie, Fivio Foreign, Lil Tjay, Nav, Gunna, and PnB Rock.

Meet the Woo 2 is a hip-hop, electronic, and drill record. The mixtape received generally favorable reviews from music critics, who praised its energy and Pop Smoke's vocals. Although Meet the Woo 2's lead single "Christopher Walking" did not chart, the mixtape's second single, "Shake the Room" featuring Quavo did, peaking at number 93 on the US Billboard Hot 100 and number 76 on the UK Singles Chart. Many bonus tracks and non-singles charted after Pop Smoke's death. "Dior" became the rapper's first solo and posthumous Billboard Hot 100 hit, peaking at number 22. "War" featuring Lil Tjay and "Element" both charted on the Canadian Hot 100, peaking at numbers 100 and 90, respectively.

The mixtape appeared on several publications' lists of the best albums of 2020; The Washington Post and Highsnobiety placed it in the top five. Meet the Woo 2 debuted at number seven on the US Billboard 200, becoming Pop Smoke's first top-10 hit on the chart. In the United States, the Recording Industry Association of America (RIAA) certified it gold. The mixtape peaked in the top 30 of record charts in Australia, Canada, Denmark, the Netherlands, Finland, New Zealand, Norway, Sweden, Switzerland, the United Kingdom, and the Belgium Flanders chart.

== Background and release ==
In January 2020, Pop Smoke announced on his TikTok account the release date for Meet the Woo 2. The announcement came a few days after federal authorities arrested the rapper at John F. Kennedy International Airport for allegedly stealing a Rolls-Royce Wraith, valued at $375,000. The owner reported it stolen after Pop Smoke had reportedly borrowed it in California for a music video shoot on the condition it be returned the next day. Police charged Pop Smoke with a federal grand theft auto charge after pressuring him to snitch on the Crips and a non-fatal shooting that took place in Brooklyn in June 2019. After the rapper refused to cooperate with authorities, he posted a $250,000 bond and agreed to stay away from known gang members and submit drug tests to the US pretrial services.

Victor Victor Worldwide and Republic Records released Meet the Woo 2 on February 7, 2020. It is the second installment in the Meet the Woo mixtape series, following Meet the Woo (2019). A deluxe edition of the mixtape, released on February 12, 2020, features three new tracks including a remix of "Dior" featuring American rapper Gunna. On January 29, 2020, Pop Smoke announced his debut concert tour Meet the Woo Tour and teased a promotional flyer of the tour to promote both Meet the Woo and Meet the Woo 2. Tour dates were announced on the same day for North America, while dates for the United Kingdom were revealed in February. The tour was planned to begin in the United States in March and end in the United Kingdom in April. On February 19, 2020, less than two weeks after the release of the standard edition of Meet the Woo 2, Pop Smoke was shot and killed at age 20 during a home invasion. Four hooded men, one wearing a ski mask and carrying a handgun, broke into a Hollywood Hills house Pop Smoke was renting. A 15-year-old boy, the youngest of the four intruders, shot Pop Smoke three times in the chest with a Beretta M9 after fighting with him. Pop Smoke was rushed to Cedars-Sinai Medical Center, where doctors performed a thoracotomy on the left side of his chest but a few hours later, he was pronounced dead.

== Music and lyrics ==
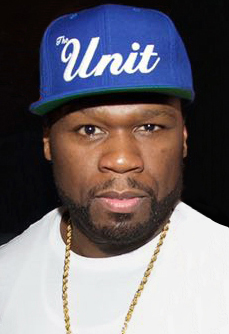
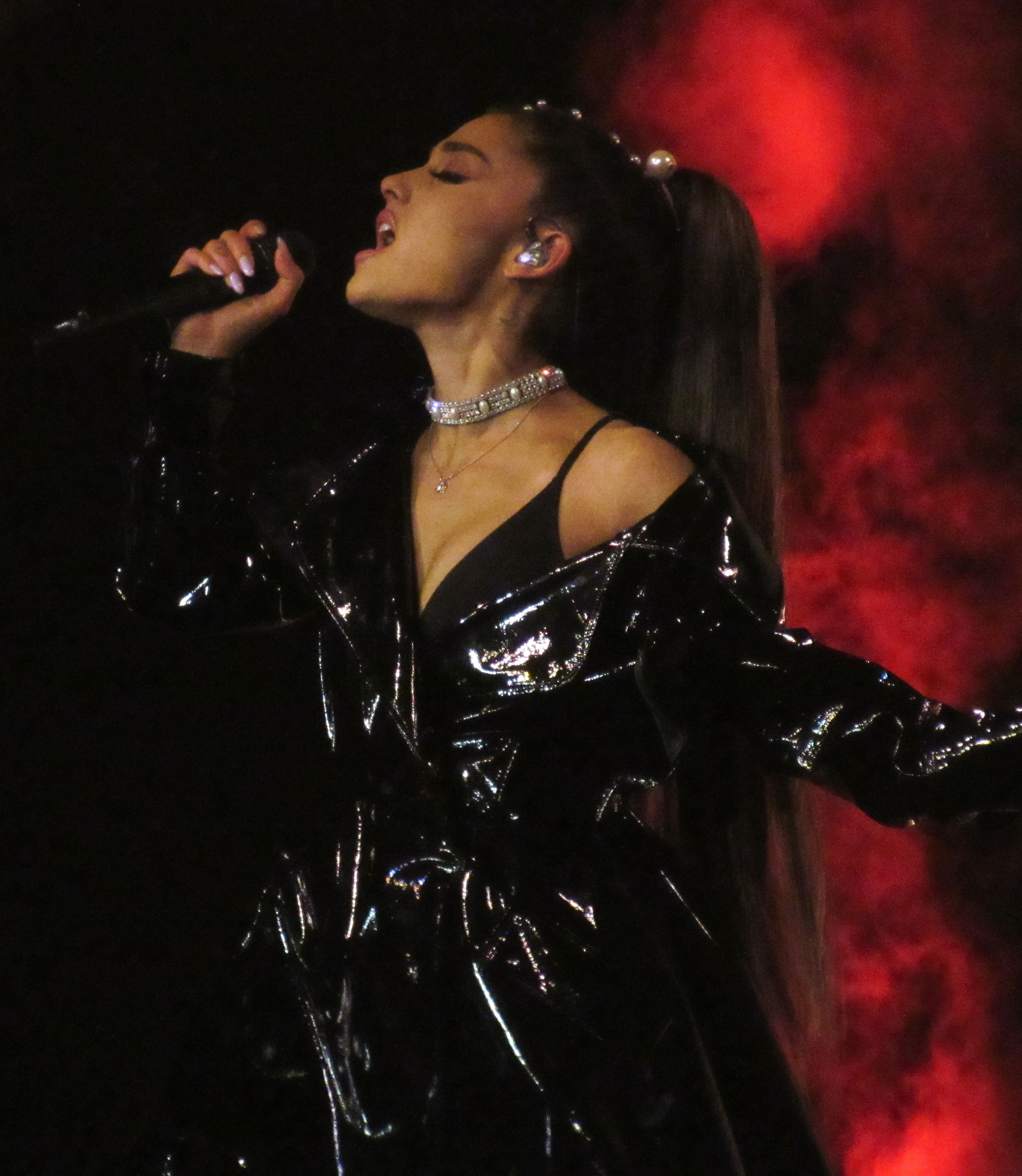
"Christopher Walking" interpolates 50 Cent's 2005 single "Window Shopper", while "Mannequin" featuring Lil Tjay samples Ariana Grande's 2019 single "7 Rings".

Writing for Pitchfork, Reed Jackson stated that Meet the Woo 2 "provides more gritty drill music you can clench your jaw to". Aron A. of HotNewHipHop mentions that Meet The Woo 2 has "London's penchant for electronic music", and that it "brings it all back to the mecca of hip-hop". The mixtape opens with "Invincible", where Pop Smoke maintains he understands the streets. This is followed by a drill track "Shake the Room" featuring Quavo. Dominiq R. of HotNewHipHop described the song as being "led by a harmonious vocal and bass-driven woodwind instrumentation". "Get Back" is a hip-hop track with a horn and string sample, a soft piano riff, bass line and police sirens. Dominiq R. commented that Pop Smoke "aggressively delivers a plethora of gun bars letting his opposition know to stay back". Drill track "Christopher Walking" feels Pop Smoke compares himself to Frank White, a character played by Christopher Walken in the 1990 American neo-noir crime thriller film King of New York. The song prominently interpolates the lyrics of 50 Cent's 2005 hit single "Window Shopper". Lyrically, Pop Smoke raps about taking shots at his enemies on the streets and mentions his love for Dior and bust-downed jewelry. "Foreigner" featuring A Boogie wit da Hoodie is a drill track with both rappers rapping about their lavish and expensive foreign items.

Kyann-Sian Williams of NME said "Sweatheart", which features Fivio Foreign, had an "affinity that went deeper than rap", and that both Pop Smoke and Fivio Foreign learned from each other and maneuvered as "drill's Batman and Robin". Jessica Mckinney and Brad Callas of Complex wrote "Element" finds Pop Smoke "rapping malicious lines over ominous production". "Armed N Dangerous (Charlie Sloth Freestyle)" was first released as a single called "Fire in the Booth, Pt. 1" in November 2019, after Pop Smoke flew to the UK to record the track with Sloth. In the lyrics, Pop Smoke raps about being part of the Crips gang. "Mannequin", featuring Lil Tjay, interpolates Ariana Grande's number one hit single "7 Rings". It is a pop and trap song with Pop Smoke and Lil Tjay rapping an ode to wealth. Jackson opined "Dreaming" is a song "that's almost entirely low end with no hint of a melody". In "She's Got a Thing", Pop Smoke raps about sexual endeavors. NME's Kyann-Sian Williams wrote Pop Smoke provides "background crooning audibly inspired by SoundCloud rapper Trippie Redd". She continues, saying he "manipulates his growling voice to sing soothing melodies". "Dior", the bonus track, is a drill and hip-hop track with lyrics about flirting with women and buying the latest designer clothes. The final bonus track, "War" featuring Lil Tjay, is a drill and hip-hop song.

== Promotion ==
=== Singles ===
Taking to Instagram, Pop Smoke teased a preview of "Christopher Walking", the mixtape's lead single, a few days before its release. Fans noticed Pop Smoke was criticizing fellow Brooklyn rappers Casanova and Smoove L in the song's preview, mentioning the former as "Trashanova" and the latter as "Scary L". Victor Victor Worldwide and Republic Records later released "Christopher Walking" on January 16, 2020. A music video for "Christopher Walking", directed by Brennan Rowe, was released the same day as the song. It features Pop Smoke driving around New York, showing his sense of style and attire as he meets fans while passing by them. The video later shows intertwined archive footage of Malcolm X, Blank Panther protests, and other historic Black American figures.

"Shake the Room" was released as the mixtape's second single on March 28, 2020. A music video for the song was released on the same day as the song's single release. Off-White founder and Louis Vuitton artistic director Virgil Abloh's Off-White International Rap Video Production Studio in Paris produced it during Paris Fashion Week. It marked Pop Smoke's first posthumous music video after his death. The visual features Pop Smoke and Quavo taking part in several activities in Paris; such as doing donuts in a red Ferrari. The song peaked at number 93 on the US Billboard Hot 100 and number 76 on the UK Singles Chart.

=== Other songs and live performances ===
"War" was released as a standalone single on October 4, 2019. A music video for the song, directed by JLShotThat, was released on October 28, 2019. Shot in black and white, the video features Pop Smoke and Lil Tjay rapping their verses in a huge mansion, as scenes switch between them on street bikes, performing live, and shutting down a show. After Pop Smoke's death, "War" debuted and peaked at number 100 on the Canadian Hot 100 on the March 6, 2020, issue, lasting one week on the chart. "Element" also peaked at number 90 on the Canadian Hot 100.

"Dior" was originally released as the sixth track on Meet the Woo, on July 26, 2019. It was later sent to American rhythmic contemporary radio as Meet the Woo's third and final single on February 11, 2020. A music video for "Dior", directed, produced, and edited by JLShotThat, was released on September 3, 2019. It features Pop Smoke and a group of men and women dancing to the track in a strip club and in a nearby parking lot. Following Pop Smoke's death, "Dior" debuted at number 49 on the Billboard Hot 100, becoming the rapper's first solo and posthumous Hot 100. Following the release of Pop Smoke's posthumous debut studio album Shoot for the Stars, Aim for the Moon (2020), "Dior" peaked at number 22 on the Hot 100. In November 2020, "Dior" received a nomination for Best Rap Performance at the 63rd Annual Grammy Awards.

In October 2019, Pop Smoke performed "Dior" live on MTV's Total Request Live offshoot program Fresh Out Friday. A month later, he performed the song for VevoDSCVR, a platform showcasing emerging young artists. Later in December, he performed "Dior" and "War" live at a Rolling Loud concert in Los Angeles, California. In February of the following year, shortly after his death, the Yard Club in Paris, France, debuted an on-stage hologram of Pop Smoke that performed "Dior" virtually.

== Critical reception ==
Meet the Woo 2 ratings
Aggregate scores
Source	Rating
Metacritic	75/100
Review scores
Source	Rating
AllMusic	4/5 stars
Exclaim!	8/10
HipHopDX	4.1/5
NME	3/5 stars
Pitchfork	7.3/10
RapReviews	6.5/10

Meet the Woo 2 was met with generally positive reviews. At Metacritic, which assigns a normalized rating out of 100 to reviews from professional publications, the album received an average score of 75, based on five reviews, indicating "generally favorable reviews".

Reed Jackson of Pitchfork enjoyed the album, saying that Meet the Woo 2 is "all sort of sounds like 'Party', but it gets over on sheer maximalism like [Meet the Woo] did, with just enough deft touches to keep things exciting". HipHopDX critic Bernadette Giacomazzo said, "Pop Smoke's raw growling was jarring and hard against these bouncy beats but surprisingly, it's also wildly effective". Reviewing the mixtape for Exclaim!, Erin Lowers stated the record "feels timely", and though the tone of "Pop Smoke's voice is already enough to set him apart from other artists coming out of New York, there's energy felt in his music that keeps you engaged. We'll have Meet the Woo 2 to remember that energy forever." Steve "Flash" Juon of RapReviews said, "As for meaningful depth to his bars, humorous "press rewind" punchlines or emotionally resonant stories, I regretfully must honestly say he didn't grab me in any of these categories. As a lyricist, he was "just there" – not terrible, not brilliant, just okay. Does he show future potential on Meet the Woo Vol. 2? Yes. Absolutely".

Fred Thomas of AllMusic commented Meet the Woo 2's has "unrelentingly raw energy" that makes it some of Pop Smoke's best material. He said every song on the mixtape "walks a razor-thin line between fun and danger, thick with the same tension that fills the room right before a fight breaks out". He concludes by saying that Pop Smoke "keeps this tension hanging for the entire duration of the tape, creating something that's exhilaratingly bleak and always ready to explode". In a less enthusiastic review, NME's Kyann-Sian William said the mixtape features some "slightly lackluster" songs, mentioning that A Boogie Wit Da Hoodie vocals on "Foreigner" are a "sloppy delivery [that] might have been scrapped entirely from the mixtape". However, she says "Pop Smoke's latest is one for the mosh-pitting party-goers".

=== Year-end lists ===
Select year-end rankings of Meet the Woo 2
Critic/Publication	List	Rank	Ref.
Billboard	The 50 Best Albums of 2020	9	
BrooklynVegan	50 Best Rap Albums of 2020	8	
BrooklynVegan	BrooklynVegan's Top 55 Albums of 2020	26	
Complex	The Best Albums of 2020	19	
Highsnobiety	The 20 Albums That Saved 2020	3	
HotNewHipHop	Top 25 Hottest Hip-Hop Albums of 2020	6	
Stereogum	The 10 Best Rap Albums of 2020	10	
Vice	The 100 Best Albums of 2020	11	
The Washington Post	Best Music of 2020	3	

== Commercial performance ==
Meet the Woo 2 debuted at number seven on the US Billboard 200 chart dated February 22, 2020, selling 36,000 album-equivalent units, including 5,000 pure album sales in its first week. This gave Pop Smoke his first top-10 hit in the United States. The mixtape reached number five on the US Top R&B/Hip-Hop Albums chart. The Recording Industry Association of America (RIAA) certified Meet the Woo 2 gold for having sold more than 500,000 album-equivalent units in the United States.

Meet the Woo 2 debuted at number 22 on the UK Albums Chart dated February 14, 2020. After Pop Smoke's death, the mixtape rose to number 16 on the chart dated February 28, 2020, giving the rapper his first top-20 hit in the UK. The British Phonographic Industry certified the mixtape silver for sales of 100,000 album-equivalent units in the United Kingdom. The mixtape peaked within the top-30 of record charts in Australia, Canada, Denmark, the Netherlands, Finland, New Zealand, Norway, Sweden, Switzerland, and on the Belgium Flanders chart.

== Track listing ==
Meet the Woo 2 standard edition
No.	Title	Lyrics	Music	Producer(s)	Length
1.	"Invincible"	Bashar Jackson	Jackson; Yosief Tafari	Yoz Beatz	2:07
2.	"Shake the Room" (featuring Quavo)	Jackson; Quavious Marshall; Andre Loblack	Jackson; Marshall; Loblack	808MeloBeats	2:45
3.	"Get Back"	Jackson	Jackson; Tafari	Yoz Beatz	1:48
4.	"Christopher Walking"	Jackson; Alex Petit; Ebony Oshunrinde; Dylan Cleary-Krell; Derrick Gray	Jackson; Petit; Oshunrinde; Cleary-Krell; Gray	CashMoneyAP; WondaGurl	3:10
5.	"Foreigner" (featuring A Boogie wit da Hoodie)	Jackson; Loblack	Jackson; Loblack; Artist Julius Dubose	808MeloBeats	2:41
6.	"Sweetheart" (featuring Fivio Foreign)	Jackson; Maxie Ryles III	Jackson; Ryles; Ricardo Lamarre; Alyamani Ouadah	Rico Beats; Yamaica	2:36
7.	"Element"	Jackson	Jackson; Tafari	Yoz Beatz	2:15
8.	"Armed n Dangerous" (Charlie Sloth freestyle)	Jackson; Jordan Townsend; Irving Adjei	Jackson; Loblack; Lamarre; Townsend; Adjei	808MeloBeats; Rico Beats	2:26
9.	"Mannequin" (featuring Lil Tjay)	Jackson; Tione Merritt	Jackson; Merritt; Loblack; Julius Babatunde	808MeloBeats	2:40
10.	"Dreaming"	Jackson; Oshuhrinde	Jackson; Loblack; Oshuhrinde	808MeloBeats	2:54
11.	"She Got a Thing"	Jackson	Jackson; Manalla Yusuf	Axl	2:05
12.	"Dior" (bonus track)	Jackson; Loblack	Jackson; Loblack	808MeloBeats	3:36
13.	"War" (featuring Lil Tjay) (bonus track)	Jackson; Merritt; Loblack; Ellis Newton	Jackson; Merritt; Loblack; Newton	808MeloBeats	3:41
Total length:					34:44

Deluxe edition (bonus tracks)
No.	Title	Lyrics	Music	Producer(s)	Length
14.	"Wolves" (featuring Nav)	Jackson; Navraj Goraya	Jackson; Goraya; Newton	Swirving; Makalo^{[b]}	3:15
15.	"Dior" (Remix; featuring Gunna)	Jackson; Sergio Kitchens	Jackson; Kitchens; Loblack	808MeloBeats	3:50
16.	"Like Me" (featuring PnB Rock)	Jackson; Rakim Allen; Jake Burdick; Daniel Villalba; Caleb Ely	Jackson; Allen; Burdick; Villalba; Ely; Othello Kwaidah	Othello Beats	3:11
Total length:					45:00

Target edition bonus track
No.	Title	Writer(s)	Producer(s)	Length
17.	"Gatti" (with JackBoys and Travis Scott)	Jackson; Jacques Webster II; Loblack; Yusuf; Michael Dean; Petr Klapka	808MeloBeats; Axl^{[a]}	3:01
Total length:				48:01

Notes

- ^{^[a]} signifies a co-producer
- ^{^[b]} signifies an additional producer

Sample credits

- "Christopher Walking" contains interpolations from "Window Shopper", performed by 50 Cent.
- "Mannequin" contains interpolations from "7 Rings", performed by Ariana Grande.

== Personnel ==
Performers

- Yoz Beatz – programming (1, 3, 7)
- Quavo – rap vocals (2)
- 808MeloBeats – programming (2, 5, 8–10, 12, 13, 15)
- CashMoneyAP – programming (4)
- A Boogie wit da Hoodie – rap vocals (5)
- Fivio Foreign – vocals (6)
- Rico Beats – programming (6, 8)
- Yamaica – programming (6)
- Lil Tjay – rap vocals (9)
- Axl – programming (11)
- Nav – rap vocals (14)
- Swirving – programming (14)
- Gunna – rap vocals (15)
- PnB Rock – rap vocals (16)
- Othello Beats – programming (16)

Technical

- Jess Jackson – mixer, mastering engineer (1–11, 16)
- Jaycen Joshua – mixer (12, 15), vocal mix (15)
- Fabian Marasciullo – mixer, mix engineer (13)
- Pro Logic – mixer, vocal mix (14)
- Colin Leonard – mastering engineer (13–15)
- Corey "Cutz" Nutile – engineer (1–11, 14–16)
- Vic Wainstein – engineer (12)
- Yung Ave – engineer (12, 15)
- Dru Oliver – engineer (13)
- TheElements – engineer (14)
- Sage Skofield – assistant mixer (1–11, 16)
- DJ Riggins – assistant mixer (12, 15), vocal mix (15)
- Jacob Richards – assistant mixer (12, 15), vocal mix (15)
- Mike Seaberg – assistant mixer (12, 15), vocal mix (15)
- Thomas McLaren – assistant mixer (13)

== Charts ==
=== Weekly charts ===
Chart performance for Meet the Woo 2
Chart (2020–2021)	Peak position
Australian Albums (ARIA)	24
Austrian Albums (Ö3 Austria)	51
Belgian Albums (Ultratop Flanders)	21
Belgian Albums (Ultratop Wallonia)	45
Canadian Albums (Billboard)	8
Danish Albums (Hitlisten)	18
Dutch Albums (Album Top 100)	14
Finnish Albums (Suomen virallinen lista)	7
French Albums (SNEP)	51
German Albums (Offizielle Top 100)	94
Irish Albums (Official Charts)	41
New Zealand Albums (RMNZ)	27
Norwegian Albums (VG-lista)	13
Swedish Albums (Sverigetopplistan)	19
Swiss Albums (Schweizer Hitparade)	30
UK Albums (Official Charts)	16
US Billboard 200	7
US Top R&B/Hip-Hop Albums (Billboard)	5

=== Year-end charts ===
2020 year-end chart performance for Meet the Woo 2
Chart (2020)	Position
Belgian Albums (Ultratop Flanders)	55
Belgian Albums (Ultratop Wallonia)	183
Canadian Albums (Billboard)	36
Danish Albums (Hitlisten)	42
Dutch Albums (Album Top 100)	34
French Albums (SNEP)	182
Icelandic Albums (Tónlistinn)	11
Swedish Albums (Sverigetopplistan)	56
UK Albums (OCC)	68
US Billboard 200	49
US Top R&B/Hip-Hop Albums (Billboard)	31

2021 year-end chart performance for Meet the Woo 2
Chart (2021)	Position
Belgian Albums (Ultratop Flanders)	109
Canadian Albums (Billboard)	43
Danish Albums (Hitlisten)	49
Dutch Albums (Album Top 100)	69
Icelandic Albums (Tónlistinn)	14
Swedish Albums (Sverigetopplistan)	73
US Billboard 200	101
US Top R&B/Hip-Hop Albums (Billboard)	80

2022 year-end chart performance for Meet the Woo 2
Chart (2022)	Position
Danish Albums (Hitlisten)	95
Icelandic Albums (Tónlistinn)	59

== Certifications ==
Certifications and sales for Meet the Woo 2
Region	Certification	Certified units/sales
Canada (Music Canada)	Gold	40,000^{‡}
Denmark (IFPI Danmark)	2× Platinum	40,000^{‡}
France (SNEP)	Gold	50,000^{‡}
Italy (FIMI)	Gold	25,000^{‡}
New Zealand (RMNZ)	Platinum	15,000^{‡}
Poland (ZPAV)	Gold	10,000^{‡}
Sweden (GLF)	Gold	15,000^{‡}
United Kingdom (BPI)	Gold	100,000^{‡}
United States (RIAA)	Gold	500,000^{‡}
^{‡} Sales+streaming figures based on certification alone.

== Release history ==
Release dates and formats for Meet the Woo 2
Region	Date	Label(s)	Format(s)	Edition	Ref.
Various	February 7, 2020	Victor Victor; Republic	Digital download; streaming; CD	Standard	
Various	February 12, 2020	Victor Victor; Republic	Digital download; streaming	Deluxe	
Various	September 4, 2020	Victor Victor; Republic	CD	Deluxe	
United States	September 4, 2020	Victor Victor; Republic	CD	Target	
Various	October 9, 2020	Victor Victor; Republic	Vinyl	Deluxe	
