= Welcome to the Party (Pop Smoke song) =

2019 debut single by Pop Smoke

Single by Pop Smoke

from the album Meet the Woo
- Released: April 23, 2019
- Recorded: 2018
- Studio: Weiland Home Studio
- Genre: Brooklyn drill
- Length: 3:34
- Label: Victor Victor; Republic
- Songwriters: Bashar Jackson; Andre Loblack
- Producer: 808Melo

Pop Smoke singles chronology
"Welcome to the Party" (2019)	"MPR" (2019)

Nicki Minaj singles chronology
"Hot Girl Summer" (2019)	"Welcome to the Party (Remix)" (2019)	"Tusa" (2019)

Skepta singles chronology
"Love Me Not" (2019)	"Welcome to the Party (Remix)" (2019)	"Kiss and Tell" (2019)

Music video
- "Welcome to the Party" on YouTube

"Welcome to the Party" is the debut single by American rapper Pop Smoke from his debut mixtape Meet the Woo (2019). It was released on April 23, 2019, by Victor Victor Worldwide and Republic Records. The song was written alongside producer 808Melo. The first official remix for "Welcome to the Party" was released on August 15, 2019, with fellow New York rapper Nicki Minaj. The second official remix with British rapper Skepta was released on August 21, 2019. Both remixes were later released on the deluxe edition of Meet the Woo.

A drill track, Pop Smoke raps about the streets and gang members. The song received positive reviews from music critics, with many praising it for introducing drill music to the mainstream. The song featured on 2019 year-end lists by Complex, The New York Times, Pitchfork, and Time. The remix featuring Minaj peaked at number five on the US Billboard Bubbling Under Hot 100 and number 48 on the Hot R&B/Hip-Hop Songs chart. It was certified a platinum certification by the Recording Industry Association of America (RIAA).

An accompanying music video for "Welcome to the Party" was directed by GoddyGoddy and released on May 28, 2019. The visual features a group of men saying the names of people who are dead or imprisoned while Pop Smoke raps the song and holds a small child in his arms. The rapper promoted the song by performing it for VevoDSCVR and MTV's Total Request Live offshoot program Fresh Ouwt Friday.

== Background and recording ==
Pop Smoke began his music career in 2018 when visiting a Brooklyn recording studio with fellow rapper Jay Gwuapo. After Gwuapo got high on drugs, he fell asleep. Pop Smoke went into a recording booth to try rapping for the first time, just to see if he could do it. He used a beat he got from British producer 808Melo's YouTube channel and recorded a remixed version of Sheff G's 2017 single "Panic Part 3" titled "Mpr (Panic Part 3 Remix)". The rapper wrote "Welcome to the Party" in his bedroom in a span of half an hour.

In April 2019, Pop Smoke befriended American producer Rico Beats, who was acquainted with record executive Steven Victor. The three set up an interview, and in April 2019, Pop Smoke signed to Victor Victor Worldwide, a subsidiary of Universal Music. On April 23, 2019, Pop Smoke released "Welcome to the Party", the lead single off his debut mixtape Meet the Woo (2019). The single was a breakout in New York, gathering millions of views on YouTube.

== Composition ==
Musically, "Welcome to the Party" is a drill track. The song has been labelled "chaotic", and features "sinister and violent" lyrics, with Pop Smoke's voice singled out for being "preposterously" and "hauntingly" deep. Complex magazine's Jessica McKinney called the song "distinctly Brooklyn", due to Pop Smoke's thick accent and the drill beat from producer 808Melo, which Pitchfork noted as being "haphazard and bass-heavy".

The staff of Vulture wrote: "[The] U.K.-grime-infused tune coupled with Pop's baritone and unconventional delivery captivated everyone from the streets of Brooklyn to the rest of the world". Pop Smoke told Genius that "Welcome to the Party" was not about girls but the streets and gangs.

== Critical reception ==
Many critics considered "Welcome to the Party" to be the anthem of New York and the anthem of summer 2019. Alphonse Pierre of Pitchfork commented it was "his borough's current summer anthem". Jon Caramanica of The New York Times stated the song is a "savagely intense growl that became one of hip-hop's songs of the summer". Complex mentioned it quickly "became one of New York's summer anthems". Briana Younger of NPR opined the song "remains an artifact of the New York summer". Dhruva Balram of NME said that the song made the "world stand up and pay attention to Pop Smoke's charisma and talent", and that it was "arguably, the song of summer [2019]".

Trey Alston of MTV stated that listening to "Welcome to the Party" felt like "50 Cent's rise all over again". Writing for Billboard magazine, Michael Saponara mentioned "Welcome to the Party" was the "record to put the hip-hop world on notice that Pop Smoke had plans of being much more than a local Brooklyn phenom". Hannah Giorgis of The Atlantic described the track as a "boisterous anthem", and said it "dominated social events and city streets all summer". Chris Richards of The Washington Post depicted the song had "already been oozing out of cracked car windows in [Pop Smoke's] native Brooklyn for an entire summer".

Paul Thompson of GQ opined it was a "hypnotic study in tone", and that "it did feel like party music, capable of cutting through the humidity and making swaths of people dance, or at least move their shoulders a little bit while they grimaced into their phones' cameras". Thomas Hobb of The Independent lauded the track as exhilarating, and opined it "bottled the energy of free-falling between two skyscrapers, cape flapping behind, as the street-smart MC convincingly framed himself as a black superhero". The song featured on 2020 year-end lists by Complex (17), The New York Times (one), Pitchfork (41), and Time (three).

== Remixes ==
After gaining popularity, the song was remixed by ASAP Ferg, Pusha T, Rico Nasty, Skepta, Headie One, Dave East and Kiing Shooter, and Meek Mill.

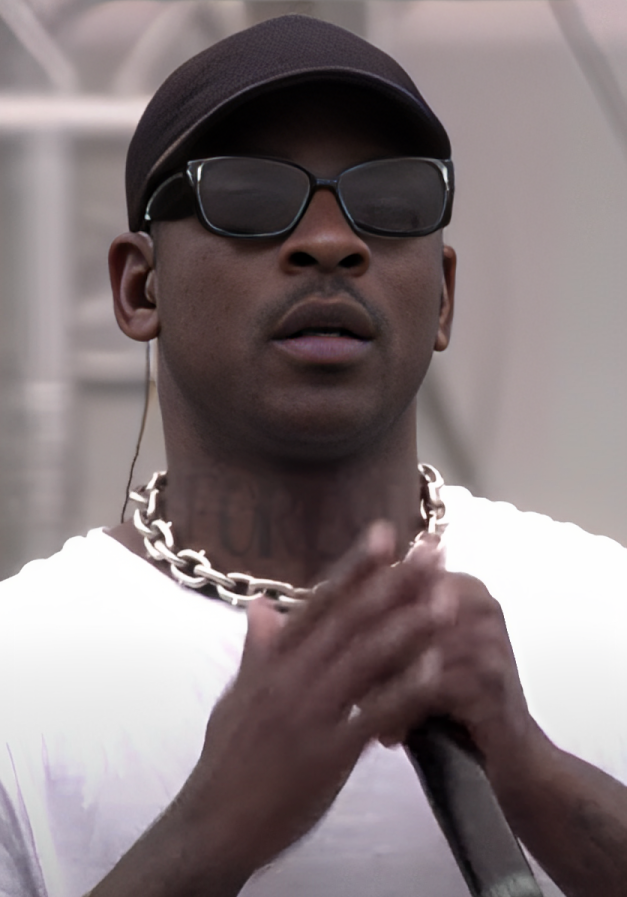
"Welcome to the Party" was promoted by two remixes, one featuring Nicki Minaj (left) and the other featuring Skepta.

Pop Smoke first revealed the official remix of "Welcome to the Party" featuring rapper Nicki Minaj, at a listening party in July 2019. It was later released on August 16, 2019. A second remix, featuring British rapper Skepta, was released on August 21, 2019. Both remixes were later included on the reissue deluxe release of Meet the Woo.

== Commercial performance ==
The remix featuring Minaj peaked at number five on the Billboard Bubbling Under Hot 100 chart. The remix featuring Minaj also peaked at number 48 on the US Hot R&B/Hip-Hop Songs chart. In May 2020, the Recording Industry Association of America (RIAA) certified "Welcome to the Party" gold for selling 500,000 certified units, making it Pop Smoke's first song to gain a gold certification in the United States. The song was later certified platinum by the RIAA for sales and streams of over 1,000,000 units in the US.

== Promotion ==
A music video for "Welcome to the Party" was released on May 28, 2019. The visual was directed, produced, and edited by GoddyGoddy. The video opens up with a group of young men saying the names of people who dead or imprisoned, while a red-lettered warning about prop guns flashes on the screen. Pop Smoke raps with a small child in his arms and while a teenager is in a few scenes. A bottle of champagne is uncorked to the beat of the song. Pitchfork ranked the music video at number 18 on their The 20 Best Music Videos of 2019, with Sam Sodomsky saying the video "operates with a similarly captivating and elusive energy. Interrupted by occasional sci-fi special effects, as if the Canarsie native [Pop Smoke] is being magically teleported around Brooklyn before our very eyes". He said it "all suits the intensity".

In October 2019, Pop Smoke performed "Welcome to the Party" live on MTV's Total Request Live offshoot program Fresh Out Friday. A month later, he performed the song for VevoDSCVR, a platform showcasing emerging young artists. In February of the next year, shortly after his death, the Yard Club in Paris, France, debuted an on-stage hologram of Pop Smoke that virtually performed "Welcome to the Party".

== Charts ==
Chart (2019–2020)	Peak position
US Bubbling Under Hot 100 (Billboard)	5
US Hot R&B/Hip-Hop Songs (Billboard)	48
US Rolling Stone Top 100	100

== Certifications ==
Region	Certification	Certified units/sales
Poland (ZPAV)	Gold	25,000^{‡}
Portugal (AFP)	Gold	5,000^{‡}
New Zealand (RMNZ)	Platinum	30,000^{‡}
United Kingdom (BPI)	Gold	400,000^{‡}
United States (RIAA)	Platinum	1,000,000^{‡}
^{‡} Sales+streaming figures based on certification alone.
