= Murder of Pop Smoke =

2020 murder in Hollywood Hills

- Photo of Pop Smoke getting CPR before being pronounced dead.
- Location: Hollywood Hills, Los Angeles, California, U.S.
- Date: February 19, 2020; 6 years ago c. 4:30 a.m. (PST)
- Target: Bashar Barakah Jackson, a.k.a. Pop Smoke
- Attack type: Murder by shooting, home invasion
- Deaths: Bashar Barakah Jackson, a.k.a. Pop Smoke
- Motive: Robbery
- Accused: Shooter: Unnamed 15-year old Accomplices: Jaquan Murphy; Keandre D. Rodgers
- Charges: First degree murder with special circumstances
- Verdict: 17-year old: Pleaded guilty Corey Walker: Pleaded guilty 15-year old: Pleaded guilty 16-year old: Pleaded guilty
- Convictions: 17-year old: Voluntary manslaughter, home invasion robbery; Corey Walker: Voluntary manslaughter, home invasion robbery with gun, gang enhancements
- Sentence: 17-year old: 4 years and 2 months in juvenile detention Corey Walker: 29 years in prison.
- Convicted: Convicted as an accomplice: Unnamed 17-year old Corey Walker; Other convictions: Unnamed 15-year old and unnamed 16 year-old entered guilty plea agreements as well.

On February 19, 2020, Bashar Barakah Jackson, better known as Pop Smoke, was renting a house through Airbnb owned by The Real Housewives star Teddi Mellencamp and her husband, Edwin Arroyave, in the Hollywood Hills of Los Angeles, California, when he was fatally shot by an unnamed 15 year old.

== Background and shooting ==
The day before his murder, Jackson and friend Michael Durodola posted several images on social media, including one in which Mellencamp's home address can be seen in the background. The rapper also posted a story on Instagram and Facebook of gifts he had received. One showed the house's full address on the packaging, giving out its location.

At around 4:30 a.m., five hooded men, including one wearing a ski mask and carrying a handgun, broke into the house through a second-story balcony. The intruders held a gun to a woman's head and threatened to kill her. Shortly thereafter, the woman heard the men shoot Jackson three times after an altercation.

The Los Angeles Police Department (LAPD) received news of the home invasion from a call from the East Coast. Police arrived at the home six minutes later and found Jackson with multiple gunshot wounds. He was rushed to Cedars-Sinai Medical Center, where doctors performed a thoracotomy on the left side of his chest. A few hours later, he was pronounced dead. He was 20 years old. On February 21, the Los Angeles County Department of Medical Examiner-Coroner revealed that the cause of Jackson's death was a gunshot wound to the chest.

Jackson's body was originally planned to be buried at Cypress Hills Cemetery but was later changed to Green-Wood Cemetery, both in Brooklyn, New York. Family, friends, and fans of Jackson gathered in his home neighborhood of Canarsie, Brooklyn, to show their respects. His casket was pulled in a horse-drawn carriage and was surrounded by glass windows and white curtains. On September 11, 2021, it was discovered that his grave site was vandalized, with the headstone smashed.

== Investigation ==
The LAPD at first suspected that Jackson's death was gang-related, as he was tied to the Crips. However, the LAPD later believed his death was the consequence of a home robbery gone wrong. It was believed the intruders stole Jackson's gold watch and other jewelry before running away from the house. In May 2021, a 15-year-old, the youngest of the four intruders, allegedly admitted to killing Jackson over a diamond-studded Rolex during a recorded interview with a cellmate at a juvenile detention center. The 15-year-old told the cellmate that Jackson at first complied with their requests for jewelry but then tried to fight them, and a confrontation broke out in which Jackson was pistol-whipped and shot with a Beretta 92. The intruders made off with his Rolex, which they sold for $2,000.

== Trial ==
On July 9, 2020, three adult men and two minors were arrested for the murder of the rapper. One of the adult suspects has been charged with murder with a special circumstance that alleged the killing was committed "during the commission of a robbery and a burglary", and another charged with attempted murder. The two juveniles were charged with murder and robbery in juvenile court.

On April 6, 2023 one of the three juvenile defendants who was a 17 year old minor at the time of the shooting had been sentenced to 4 years and 2 months in juvenile detention after pleading guilty to voluntary manslaughter and home invasion burglary. On May 12, 2023, an 18 year old defendant, who was 15 years old at the time of the shooting, admitted to firing the shot which killed Jackson. As of 2025, this defendant remained in juvenile custody, as was expected to remain in juvenile custody until he turned 25 years old. Though the confessed shooter was not immediately reported as being sentenced, it was later confirmed that each of the juvenile defendants, including the shooter, had in fact undertaken guilty pleas.

On February 4, 2025, Corey Walker, the only adult who was being tried for Jackson's murder, pled guilty to voluntary manslaughter and two counts of home invasion. On February 21, 2025, Corey Walker received a 29-year prison sentence. During his sentencing, Walker apologized to Jackson's family, stating, among other things, that "there's no apology that amounts to the taking of someone's life," and "today I take responsibility for my dreadful partake in these crimes, and as I begin my road to rehabilitation, I assure you that I will steer clear from negative behavior." The same day, Entertainment Weekly revealed that all of the other three individuals who had been tried for Jackson's murder, all of whom were minors aged 15, 16, and 17 years old at the time of the shooting, had pled guilty for crimes related to the murder as well, entering separate plea agreements through juvenile court.

== Remembrance ==
Jackson's parents, Audrey and Greg Jackson, shared memories of their son before saying how gun violence took him away from them.

On February 19th, at 4:00 AM, a gun was used to take my son from me. You know him as Pop Smoke, we called him 'Shar'. Because of gun violence, I'll never see my son run up the front of our steps, taking them two at a time; he won't ever take my hands again and dance with me; he won't come into my room and muscle pose in the mirror. Gun violence destroys families. It must stop.

— Audrey Jackson during a "Gun Violence Destroys families”

Danny Schwartz wrote in The Ringer that "Pop Smoke conquered New York rap and gave the city the kind of readymade and potentially defining star it hadn't seen in years". He claimed that "in the city, ['Welcome to the Party'] was more omnipresent than hits like 'Old Town Road'."

Jackson's work ethic was widely praised by his peers in the music industry. The executive producer of his posthumous album, 50 Cent, told the New York Times that Jackson wrote down 50 Cent's advice, while Quavo added he "felt like [he] was talking to somebody that had been in the game for three years already".
