= 808Melo =

English music producer (born 1997)

- Also known as: 808MeloBeats
- Born: Andre Michael Loblack; 6 April 1997 (age 29); Ilford, London, England
- Genres: Hip hop; drill
- Occupations: Record producer; songwriter
- Years active: 2016–present
- Label: Victor Victor

Andre Michael Loblack (born 6 April 1997), known professionally as 808Melo or 808MeloBeats, is an English record producer and songwriter. 808Melo is credited as a pioneer of drill music, UK drill and Brooklyn drill and is known for his bass heavy percussion. In 2019, he produced Pop Smoke's debut mixtape, Meet the Woo. He also produced most of the songs on Pop Smoke's sophomore mixtape, Meet the Woo 2, and he helped produce Pop Smoke's posthumous album Shoot for the Stars, Aim for the Moon, which topped the Billboard Hot 100 artist charts in July 2020. 808Melo has also produced songs for Travis Scott, Fivio Foreign, and Lil Tjay.

== Career ==
808Melo started producing in 2016 when he bought a laptop computer and the FL Studio digital audio workstation program. He developed a style of crisp bass lines with sliding 808 percussion drum patterns. He became popular in the UK after producing songs for Headie One, 410, K-Trap, CB and OFB. The latter lead to him be recognized as one of the best producers for UK drill music with Headie One and RV’s “Know Better” in early 2018.

After producing for Headie One, OFB and K-Trap, his music was discovered by Pop Smoke, who enlisted him to produce his debut mixtape, Meet the Woo.

808Melo produced Pop Smoke's "Welcome to the Party" in 2019, which went viral on YouTube and was certified platinum by the RIAA in 2020.

The song was later remixed by Skepta and Nicki Minaj. It peaked at number 5 on the Billboard 100 Bubbling Under chart. Later in 2019, he and AXL Beats gained a mainstream hit for producing the single “GATTI” by Travis Scott and Pop Smoke, which appeared on the former's collaborative tape, JACKBOYS.

808Melo primarily produced Pop Smoke's second mixtape Meet the Woo 2. He produced 4 out of the 18 original tracks on Pop Smoke's posthumous album entitled Shoot for the Stars, Aim for the Moon, which reached number one on the Billboard 200 Chart. In May 2020, 808Melo earned platinum certification for producing Pop Smoke's “Dior”.

Since the death of Pop Smoke, 808Melo has produced for rappers YoungBoy Never Broke Again, Quando Rondo, Lil Tjay, Fivio Foreign, Freeze Corleone, Smoove’L, Blizz Vito, 22Gz and Sheff G, as well as Italian rapper Lazza on several occasions.

== Production discography ==
=== Mixtapes ===
- Meet the Woo by Pop Smoke, released: 26 July 2019 via Victor Victor and Republic Records
- Meet the Woo 2 by Pop Smoke, released: 7 February 2020 via Victor Victor and Republic Records

=== Albums ===
- Shoot for the Stars, Aim for the Moon by Pop Smoke, released on 3 July 2020 via Victor Victor Worldwide and Republic Records
