= Pop Smoke =

American rapper (1999–2020)

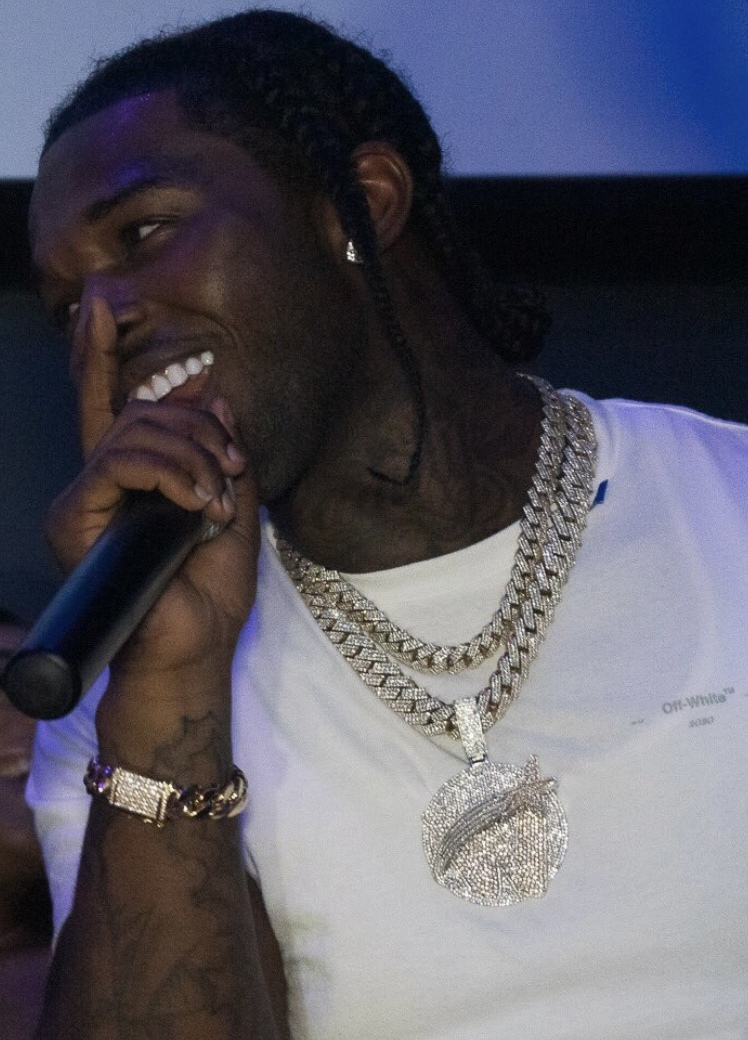
- Pop Smoke performing in February 2020
- Born: Bashar Barakah Jackson; July 20, 1999; Brooklyn, New York City, U.S.
- Died: February 19, 2020 (aged 20); Los Angeles, California, U.S.
- Cause of death: Murder (gunshot wounds)
- Resting place: Green-Wood Cemetery, Brooklyn, New York City, U.S.
- Other name: Shar
- Occupations: Rapper; singer; songwriter; actor
- Years active: 2018–2020
- Musical career
- Genres: East Coast hip-hop; Brooklyn drill; R&B
- Works: Pop Smoke discography
- Labels: Victor Victor; Republic
- Website: realpopsmoke.com

Bashar Barakah Jackson (July 20, 1999 – February 19, 2020), known professionally as Pop Smoke, was an American rapper and singer. Born and raised in Brooklyn, New York City, he rose to fame with the release of his 2019 singles "Welcome to the Party" and "Dior". He frequently collaborated with UK drill artists and producers, who employed more minimal and aggressive instrumentation than American drill artists from Chicago, reintroducing the sound as Brooklyn drill.

Following his rise to fame, record producer Rico Beats introduced Pop Smoke to Steven Victor in April 2019. Victor would later have Pop Smoke sign a recording contract with Victor Victor Worldwide and Republic Records. He released his debut mixtape Meet the Woo in July 2019. His second mixtape, Meet the Woo 2, was released on February 7, 2020, and debuted at number seven on the Billboard 200, becoming the rapper's first top-10 project in the United States.

Twelve days after the mixtape's release, Pop Smoke was murdered during a home invasion in Los Angeles. Fellow New York rapper 50 Cent served as executive producer for his posthumous debut studio album, Shoot for the Stars, Aim for the Moon (2020), which debuted atop the Billboard 200; all 19 of its tracks entered the Billboard Hot 100. The album also spawned the singles "For the Night" (featuring DaBaby and Lil Baby) and "What You Know Bout Love". The following year, Republic released Pop Smoke's second studio album, Faith (2021).

== Early life ==
Bashar Barakah Jackson was born on July 20, 1999, in Brooklyn, New York City, to a Jamaican mother, Audrey Jackson, and a Panamanian father, Greg Jackson. He had an older brother named Obasi. Jackson attended nine different schools while growing up in Canarsie, Brooklyn. He played the African drums and sang in his local church as a child.

Jackson was expelled from eighth grade for bringing a gun to school. He spent two years under house arrest after being charged with possessing a weapon. Jackson started playing basketball as a point and shooting guard. He relocated to Philadelphia to enroll in Rocktop Academy. He was later forced to leave after being diagnosed with a heart murmur, and Jackson eventually turned to street life. He ultimately graduated from the Brooklyn Democracy Academy.

== Career ==
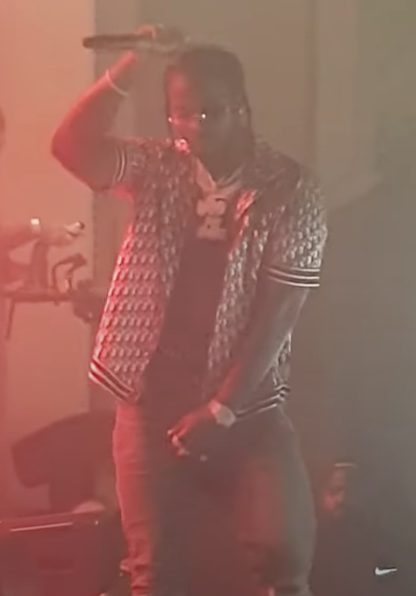
Pop Smoke performing in 2019

In a Genius interview, he stated that his artist name of Pop Smoke is a combination of Poppa, a name given to him by his Panamanian grandmother, and Smocco Guwop, a nickname from childhood friends. He first attempted rapping during a 2018 visit to a Brooklyn recording studio with Jay Gwuapo. In late 2018, he was rapping over a beat from 808Melo's YouTube channel, Jackson recorded a track titled "MPR (Panic Part 3 Remix)" during the session. On January 28, 2019, he released "Flexin'". Meanwhile, Jackson befriended producer Rico Beats, who was acquainted with record executive Steven Victor.

The three set up an interview, and in April 2019, Jackson signed to Victor Victor Worldwide and Republic Records. On April 23, 2019, Jackson released his breakout single, "Welcome to the Party", that was produced by 808Melo. Many remixes of the song were later recorded, with the commercially released versions featuring Nicki Minaj and the other featuring Skepta. Jackson released his debut mixtape Meet the Woo on July 26, 2019. From October to December 2019, Jackson released multiple singles, including "War" with Lil Tjay, and "100k on a Coupe" with Calboy.

On December 27, 2019, Jackson appeared on Travis Scott's Cactus Jack Records compilation album JackBoys on the song "Gatti" which was also accompanied by a music video. "Gatti" debuted and peaked at number 69 on the US Billboard Hot 100, giving Jackson his first and only Hot 100 appearance before his death. On January 16, 2020, Jackson released "Christopher Walking". On February 7, 2020, twelve days before his death, Jackson released his second mixtape Meet the Woo 2, with features from Quavo, A Boogie wit da Hoodie, Fivio Foreign and Lil Tjay.

The mixtape debuted at number seven on the US Billboard 200, earning Jackson his first top-10 hit in the United States. Five days after its release, a deluxe edition was released with three new songs, each featuring a guest appearance, consisting of Nav, Gunna, and PnB Rock. Jackson teased to social media his debut headlining concert tour Meet the Woo Tour to promote both his mixtapes. The tour was planned to begin in the US in March, and end in the UK in April.

== Posthumous releases ==
"Dior", the second single off Meet the Woo, became Jackson's first posthumous solo hit, peaking at number 22 on the Billboard Hot 100 and number 33 on the UK Singles Chart. At the beginning of March 2020, American rapper 50 Cent announced on his Instagram that he had decided to executive produce and finish Jackson's debut studio album. After his announcement, 50 Cent called artists like Roddy Ricch, Drake, and Chris Brown, wanting to feature them on the record. Pop Smoke had wanted to take his mother to an awards show, prompting 50 Cent to promise to take her to one when the album was complete.

On April 16, 2020, a documentary on Pop Smoke's life was announced to be in the works.

On May 14, 2020, Victor announced that Pop Smoke's debut studio album would be posthumously released on June 12, 2020. The album was named Shoot for the Stars, Aim for the Moon. It was originally set for release on June 12, 2020, but was pushed back out of respect for the George Floyd protests. Instead, on the album's original release date, the lead single, "Make It Rain", featuring fellow Brooklyn rapper Rowdy Rebel was released. Rebel's verse was recorded through a collect call since he was incarcerated at the time. Virgil Abloh created the album's original artwork. The cover artwork provoked significant criticism from fans who called it "lazy" and "rushed" and felt it was disrespectful. It prompted a Change.org petition, attracting tens of thousands of signatures. Ryder Ripps created the final cover art with the chrome rose against a black background. Jackson's mother chose the final album cover hours before the album was released commercially.

The album was officially released on July 3, 2020, to commercial success, reaching number one in several countries, including on the Billboard 200. All 19 songs on the album charted on the Billboard Hot 100, with "For the Night" featuring Lil Baby and DaBaby, debuting and peaking at number six, giving Pop Smoke his first top-10 hit in the US. On July 20, 2020, which would have been Jackson's 21st birthday, a deluxe edition of the album was released, and featured 15 new additional tracks. The album's fifth single "What You Know Bout Love", ended up peaking at number nine on the Billboard Hot 100, giving Pop Smoke his second top-10 hit in the US. On February 26, 2021, "AP" was released as the lead single for the Boogie soundtrack. Pop Smoke was cast as Monk in a minor role for Boogie.

A second posthumous album titled Faith was released on July 16, 2021, to mixed reviews. It debuted at number one on the Billboard 200, making Pop Smoke the first artist to have their first two posthumous albums debut at the top of the chart. A deluxe version, featuring four additional tracks, was released on July 20, 2021, on what would have been Jackson's 22nd birthday. Six more tracks were added on July 30.

== Legal issues ==
On January 17, 2020, after returning from Paris Fashion Week, Jackson was arrested by federal authorities at John F. Kennedy International Airport after stealing a Rolls-Royce Wraith, valued at $375,000, whose owner reported it stolen after Jackson had reportedly borrowed it in California for a music video shoot on the condition it would be returned the next day. Investigators believed he arranged for the car to be transported on a flatbed truck to New York. He posted a photo of himself in front of the stolen car on Instagram and Facebook. The car was recovered by authorities at Jackson's mother's house, in the Canarsie section of Brooklyn.

After his arrest, police questioned him about a non-fatal shooting that took place in Brooklyn in June 2019. The police thought he had information on the shooting because they claimed to have footage of him driving a car in reverse near the scene of the crime. The police also tried to pressure Jackson into telling them more information about the Crips, GS9, and other Brooklyn street gangs, but he refused to talk.

He was charged with grand theft auto, posted a $250,000 bond, and agreed to stay away from known gang members and submit drug tests to the US pretrial services. The conditions Jackson was put under hindered some of his performances like the "BK Drip Concert" at Kings Theatre in Flatbush in February 2020, as gang members were in the audience.

== Murder ==
Jackson rented a house through Airbnb owned by Teddi Mellencamp Arroyave and her husband, Edwin Arroyave, in the Hollywood Hills, where he was fatally shot on February 19, 2020, at the age of 20. On February 21, 2025, Corey Walker received a 29-year prison sentence after pleading guilty to one voluntary manslaughter charge and two home invasion charges which were connected to Jackson's murder. The other three individuals being tried for Jackson's murder would all be convicted as well after entering separate guilty plea deals in juvenile court. On May 12, 2023, an 18 year old defendant, who was 15 years old at the time of the shooting, admitted to firing the shot which killed Jackson. Though not immediately reported as being sentenced, it was afterwards reported that the person who confessed to shooting of Jackson was expected to remain in juvenile custody until he turned 25 years old. One of the three juvenile system defendants who was a 17 year old minor at the time of the shooting had been sentenced to 4 years and 2 months in juvenile detention in April 2023.

== Discography ==
Studio albums

- Shoot for the Stars, Aim for the Moon (2020)
- Faith (2021)

== Awards and nominations ==
Year	Award	Nominated work	Category	Result	Ref.
2020	BET Awards	Himself	Best New Artist	Nominated	
2020	MTV Video Music Awards	Himself	Push Best New Artist	Longlisted	
2020	MTV Video Music Awards	"The Woo" (featuring 50 Cent and Roddy Ricch)	Song of Summer	Nominated	
2020	BET Hip Hop Awards	Himself	Best New Hip-Hop Artist	Won	
2021	ARIA Music Awards	Pop Smoke – Shoot for the Stars, Aim for the Moon	ARIA Award for Best International Artist	Nominated	
2021	Grammy Awards	"Dior"	Best Rap Performance	Nominated	
2021	Billboard Music Awards	Himself	Top Artist	Nominated	
2021	Billboard Music Awards	Himself	Top New Artist	Won	
2021	Billboard Music Awards	Himself	Top Male Artist	Nominated	
2021	Billboard Music Awards	Himself	Top Billboard 200 Artist	Nominated	
2021	Billboard Music Awards	Himself	Top Hot 100 Artist	Nominated	
2021	Billboard Music Awards	Himself	Top Streaming Songs Artist	Nominated	
2021	Billboard Music Awards	Himself	Top Rap Artist	Won	
2021	Billboard Music Awards	Himself	Top Rap Male Artist	Won	
2021	Billboard Music Awards	Shoot for the Stars, Aim for the Moon	Top Billboard 200 Album	Won	
2021	Billboard Music Awards	Shoot for the Stars, Aim for the Moon	Top Rap Album	Won	

== Filmography ==
Year	Title	Role	Notes
2021	Boogie	Monk	Antagonist
TBA	TBA	Himself	Documentary †

Key
†	Denotes films that have not yet been released

== See also ==
- List of murdered hip-hop musicians
