= Daddy (Blueface song) =

2019 single by Blueface featuring Rich the Kid

Single by Blueface featuring Rich the Kid

from the EP Dirt Bag
- Released: June 14, 2019
- Genre: West Coast hip-hop; trap
- Length: 2:31
- Label: Cash Money; Republic
- Songwriters: Johnathan Porter; Dimitri Roger; Michael Crook; Earl Johnson
- Producers: Mike Crook; Scum Beatz

Blueface singles chronology
| "Stop Cappin" (2019) | "Daddy" (2019) | "Bussdown" (2019) |

Rich the Kid singles chronology
| "Save That" (2019) | "Daddy" (2019) | "Go Up" (2019) |

Music video
- "Daddy ft. Rich the Kid" on YouTube

"Daddy" is a song by American rapper Blueface, released on June 14, 2019. It is the second single from his second EP Dirt Bag (2019), and features American rapper Rich the Kid. The song was produced by Scum Beatz and Mike Crook, both of whom also wrote the song with the rappers.

== Composition ==
The track samples Blueface's "Thotiana" and interpolates his song "ID" as well as "Uno" by American rapper Ambjaay. Joshua Espinoza of Complex has described the track to be "reminiscent" of "Thotiana", as it features "an extremely catchy, club-ready beat and braggadocios lines about sex and designer goods." Blueface lists off many famous luxury designers in the song. "Daddy" has been regarded as a summer-themed song.

== Music video ==
The music video was released on June 20, 2019. Directed by Malcolm Jones and produced by Monica A. Young and Jai Santiago, it features Blueface and Rich the Kid throwing a pool party with twerking bikini-clad models. The rappers also show off shoes and bags from several brands throughout.

== Charts ==
| Chart (2019) | Peak position |
|---|---|
| Canada (Canadian Hot 100) | 72 |
| US Billboard Hot 100 | 78 |
| US Hot R&B/Hip-Hop Songs (Billboard) | 30 |

== Certifications ==
| Region | Certification | Certified units/sales |
|---|---|---|
| United States (RIAA) | Platinum | 1,000,000^{‡} |
^{‡} Sales+streaming figures based on certification alone.
