= Find the Beat =

Studio album by Blueface
- Released: March 13, 2020
- Recorded: 2019–2020
- Genre: West Coast hip hop; G-funk; trap
- Length: 41:29
- Label: Cash Money; Republic
- Producer: Bighead; D. A. Doman; Extendo; FBeats; LowTheGreat; Mally Mall; Manzo; MCM Raymond; Mike Crook; Sammy P Beats; Scum Beatz; Synco; YikeMike

Blueface chronology
Dirt Bag (2019)	Find the Beat (2020)	Famous Cryp (Reloaded) (2020)

Singles from Find the Beat
- 1. "Close Up" Released: October 11, 2019; 2. "First Class" Released: October 18, 2019; 3. "Obama" Released: February 7, 2020; 4. "Holy Moly" Released: March 6, 2020

Professional ratings
Review scores
Source	Rating
AllMusic	3/5 stars
HipHopDX	2.4/5

Find the Beat is the debut studio album by American rapper Blueface. It was released on March 13, 2020, by Cash Money Records and Republic Records. The album features guest appearances by Gunna, Lil Baby, Polo G, DaBaby, Ambjaay, NLE Choppa, Stunna 4 Vegas, Jeremih, and YBN Nahmir. It was originally scheduled to be released on December 6, 2019, but was delayed due to trademark issues. A second release date, January 17, 2020, was confirmed but the album did not release for unknown reasons. A third release date was then announced for March 13, 2020.

== Release and promotion ==
Blueface shared the album's title and track listing on October 11, 2019. The same day, he released the album's lead single, "Close Up" featuring Jeremih.

The album's second single, "First Class" featuring Gunna, was released on October 18, 2019.

Music videos for "Close Up" and "First Class" were released on October 23 and 25, respectively.

A new non-album single, "Finesse the Beat", was released on YouTube and SoundCloud on December 22, 2019.

On November 7, 2019, he announced on his Instagram account that the album would be released on December 6. It, however, did not release then due to clearance issues.

On January 4, 2020, he announced a second release date of January 17, but the album was delayed further for unknown reasons.

On February 7, 2020, the album's third single, "Obama" featuring DaBaby was released.

On March 1, 2020, Blueface went on Instagram, posting a blurry picture of himself saying the album would be released on March 13, and claimed that "joke's over". The next day, he posted a short clip of the music video for the single "Holy Moly" featuring NLE Choppa, set for release four days later. He earlier posted a previous clip on Instagram on February 27 asking if he should drop it. The song was released on March 6, 2020, with an accompanying music video.

On March 13, 2020, the full album was released with slight changes. The track listing was slightly changed and new tracks were added, as well as some were removed. There was also an extra feature from American rapper Polo G.

== Track listing ==
Find the Beat track listing
No.	Title	Writer(s)	Producer(s)	Length
1.	"First Class" (featuring Gunna)	Johnathan Porter; Sergio Kitchens; Felipe Huerta	FBeats; Sammy P Beats	3:11
2.	"Vibes"	Porter; David Doman; Christina Doman; Danny Levin	D. A. Doman	2:15
3.	"Weekend" (featuring Lil Baby)	Porter; Dominique Jones; Alexander Wu	Synco	3:08
4.	"Murder Rate" (featuring Polo G)	Porter; Taurus Bartlett; Wu; Brendan Murray; Peter Munzo	Bighead; Manzo; Synco	2:03
5.	"Obama" (featuring DaBaby)	Porter; Jonathan Kirk; Earl Johnson; Cash Jones	Scum Beatz	2:08
6.	"Carne Asada" (featuring Ambjaay)	Porter; Jayvon May; Huerta	FBeats	2:59
7.	"Viral"	Porter; Johnson	Scum Beatz	2:14
8.	"Holy Moly" (featuring NLE Choppa)	Porter; Bryson Potts; Johnson	Scum Beatz	1:58
9.	"Dirty"	Porter; D. Doman; Greg Sekeres; Justin Thomas	D. A. Doman	2:13
10.	"Wire" (featuring Stunna 4 Vegas)	Porter; Khalick Caldwell; Michael Crook; Spencer Anderson	Mike Crook; Extendo	1:54
11.	"Double Bacc"	Porter; Johnson	Scum Beatz	2:36
12.	"Period"	Porter; Johnson	Scum Beatz	3:15
13.	"Close Up" (featuring Jeremih)	Porter; Jeremy Felton; Jamal Rashid	Mally Mall	2:56
14.	"In the Zone"	Porter; Michael Dunford; Makai Franklin	YikeMike; MCM Raymond	3:24
15.	"Street Shit"	Porter; Johnson	Scum Beatz	2:44
16.	"2 Diccs" (featuring YBN Nahmir)	Porter; Nicholas Simmons; Crook; Deangelo Smith	Mike Crook; LowTheGreat	2:31
Total length:				41:29

== Charts ==
Chart performance for Find the Beat
Chart (2020)	Peak position
Canadian Albums (Billboard)	65
US Billboard 200	64
US Top R&B/Hip-Hop Albums (Billboard)	39
