= Stop Cappin =

2019 single by Blueface

Single by Blueface

from the EP Dirt Bag
- Released: May 3, 2019
- Genre: Hip hop
- Length: 2:41
- Label: Cash Money
- Songwriter(s): Johnathan Porter; Omar Peralta
- Producer(s): HvnnidBand

Blueface singles chronology
"Slide" (2019)	"Stop Cappin" (2019)	"Daddy" (2019)

Music video
- "Stop Cappin" on YouTube

"Stop Cappin" is a song by American rapper Blueface, released on May 3, 2019 and produced by HvnnidBand. An official remix of the song featuring American rapper The Game appears on Blueface's second EP Dirt Bag.

== Composition and lyrics ==
The song finds Blueface rapping in his signature offbeat flow over a beat that is described as bouncy with keys reminiscent of his song "Thotiana". He boasts about his meteoric rise and addresses his critics, beginning with the chorus, "Stop cappin'! I'm really poppin' / How can I slip if I'm the one doing the moppin'?" The lyrics are a reference to his "mop the floor" line from the song "Respect My Cryppin'".

== Music video ==
The music video was directed by Aaron Greene and released on May 1, 2019. It opens with two men speaking ill of Blueface. They follow him once they see him working his night job as a janitor at a local establishment in Los Angeles, but Blueface removes the wet floor sign and catches one of them slipping. Blueface, who is wearing a bulletproof vest and Cash Money West medallion, flaunts himself in an abandoned garage as he splashes reddish-tinged water around from his bucket, mops the floor, and Crip Walks. He also cruises through the streets of the city at night in a Bentley convertible with his bosses Birdman and Wack 100.

== Remix ==
The official remix was released on August 9, 2019 from Dirt Bag and features the Game. Mitch Findlay had a favorable reaction to the remix, commenting that "With Born To Rap on the way, 'Stop Cappin' feels like a warm-up for Game, who deftly uses the platform to talk his shit" and "While it's not exactly a groundbreaking collaboration, Game's output has been relatively rare - thus, when he does surface, it feels significant."

== Charts ==
Chart (2019)	Peak position
US Bubbling Under Hot 100 Singles (Billboard)	15
US Bubbling Under R&B/Hip-Hop Singles (Billboard)	2
