= Bleed It =

2019 single by Blueface

"Bleed lt"

Single by Blueface

from the EP Dirt Bag
- Released: January 11, 2019
- Recorded: 2018
- Genre: West Coast hip hop; gangsta rap
- Length: 2:25
- Label: Cash Money; Republic
- Songwriters: Johnathan Porter; Michael Crook
- Producer: Mike Crook

Blueface singles chronology
"Respect My Cryppin'" (2018)	"Bleed lt" (2019)	"West Coast" (2019)

Music video
- "Bleed It" on YouTube

"Bleed It" is a song by American rapper Blueface. It was released as a single on January 11, 2019 and released to rhythmic radio on February 19, 2019. It is the lead single from his second extended play, Dirt Bag (2019). The music video, directed by Cole Bennett, was released prior in December 2018 on the Lyrical Lemonade YouTube channel. It reached number 46 on the US Billboard Hot R&B/Hip-Hop Songs chart after the success of his previous single "Thotiana".

== Critical reception ==
Along with Blueface's other tracks "Thotiana" and "Next Big Thing", HotNewHipHop said that on "Bleed It", "it's clear that Blueface has a knack for stringing together some pretty funny yet lyrical bars". Trent Fitzgerald of XXL said the track features "gun-toting rhymes".

== Music video ==
The music video for "Bleed It" was directed by Cole Bennett for Lyrical Lemonade and released in December 2018. It features Blueface walking around his neighborhood with his friends, with Hypebeast observing that Blueface is "stunting". The Fader summarized the video as "Blueface, his friends, and a mop all cut together with datamosh-y special effects".

== Charts ==
Chart (2019)	Peak position
US Bubbling Under Hot 100 Singles (Billboard)	2
US Hot R&B/Hip-Hop Songs (Billboard)	46

== Certifications ==
Region	Certification	Certified units/sales
United States (RIAA)	Gold	500,000^{‡}
^{‡} Sales+streaming figures based on certification alone.
