= Bussdown (disambiguation) =

"Bussdown" is a song by Blueface. It may also refer to:

- "Bussdown", a song by Gucci Mane from Delusions of Grandeur
- "Bussdown", a song by Latto from 777
- "Bussdown", a song by Maxo Kream from Punken
