= Slide (French Montana song) =

2019 single by French Montana featuring Blueface and Lil Tjay

Single by French Montana featuring Blueface and Lil Tjay

from the album Montana
- Released: April 16, 2019
- Length: 3:06
- Label: Epic
- Songwriter(s): Karim Kharbouch; Johnathan Porter; Tione Merritt; Andre Young; Ashton Vines; Baruch Nembhard; Calvin Broadus Jr.; Clarence Satchell; Delmar Arnaud; Eric Collins; Gregory Webster; Joseph Williams; Lawrence Parker; Leroy Bonner; Marshall Jones; Marvin Pierce; Norman Napier; Philip Thomas; Ralph Middlebrooks; Ricardo brown; Walter Morrison
- Producer(s): Mixx; French Montana; Ashton

French Montana singles chronology
"Medicine" (2018)	"Slide" (2019)	"Wiggle It" (2019)

Blueface singles chronology
"West Coast (Remix)" (2019)	"Slide" (2019)	"Stop Cappin" (2019)

Lil Tjay singles chronology
"Your Love" (2019)	"Slide" (2019)	"Ruthless" (2019)

Music video
- "Slide" on YouTube

"Slide" is a song by American rapper French Montana featuring American rappers Blueface and Lil Tjay. It was released on April 16, 2019, through Epic Records. The music video was also released 2 days later The song debuted at number 90 on the US Billboard Hot 100 and at number 89 in the UK. A remix featuring American rapper Wiz Khalifa was released on June 7, 2019, with Blueface and Lil Tjay still in the song.

== Background ==
The song features a sample of Snoop Dogg's 1993 song "Serial Killa".

== Critical reception ==
Paper described the song as a "dynamic, hook-heavy jam that has the potential to set off a viral summer dance trend".

== Music video ==
The video was co-directed by French Montana and Spiff TV and released on April 18, 2019. It features French Montana, Blueface and Lil Tjay dressed in colorful suits and wearing skull masks. Paper called the video "equal parts Dia de los Muertos, mobsters, and Dick Tracy". Rolling Stone said it "mixes the macabre and the stylish".

== Charts ==
Chart (2019)	Peak position
Canada (Canadian Hot 100)	54
New Zealand Hot Singles (RMNZ)	13
UK Singles (OCC)	81
US Billboard Hot 100	90
US Hot R&B/Hip-Hop Songs (Billboard)	33
US Rhythmic (Billboard)	20

== Certifications ==
Region	Certification	Certified units/sales
Canada (Music Canada)	Gold	40,000^{‡}
United States (RIAA)	Gold	500,000^{‡}
^{‡} Sales+streaming figures based on certification alone.
