= Bussdown =

2019 single by Blueface featuring Offset

Single by Blueface featuring Offset

from the EP Dirt Bag
- Released: July 4, 2019
- Genre: Hip hop
- Length: 3:02
- Label: Cash Money
- Songwriter(s): Johnathan Porter; Kiari Cephus; Earl Johnson
- Producer(s): Scum Beatz

Blueface singles chronology
"Daddy" (2019)	"Bussdown" (2019)	"Bop" (2019)

Offset singles chronology
"Fast (Remix)" (2019)	"Bussdown" (2019)	"Baby Sitter" (2019)

Music video
- "Bussdown" on YouTube

"Bussdown" is a song by American rapper Blueface, released on July 4, 2019 as the third single from his second EP Dirt Bag (2019). It features American rapper Offset and was produced by Scum Beatz.

== Content ==
The song revolves around Blueface entering a wealthy lifestyle. In the chorus, he raps about how he used to "ride the bus down" but now wears luxury watches.

== Music video ==
The music video was directed by Cole Bennett and released alongside the single. In it, Blueface assumes the role of a bus driver. He drives through a 3D animated desert, where he encounters aliens, flying saucers and dancing women. Meanwhile, Offset stays in the parking lot.

== Charts ==
Chart (2019)	Peak position
New Zealand Hot Singles (RMNZ)	23
