= DDG (rapper) =

American rapper and YouTuber (born 1997)

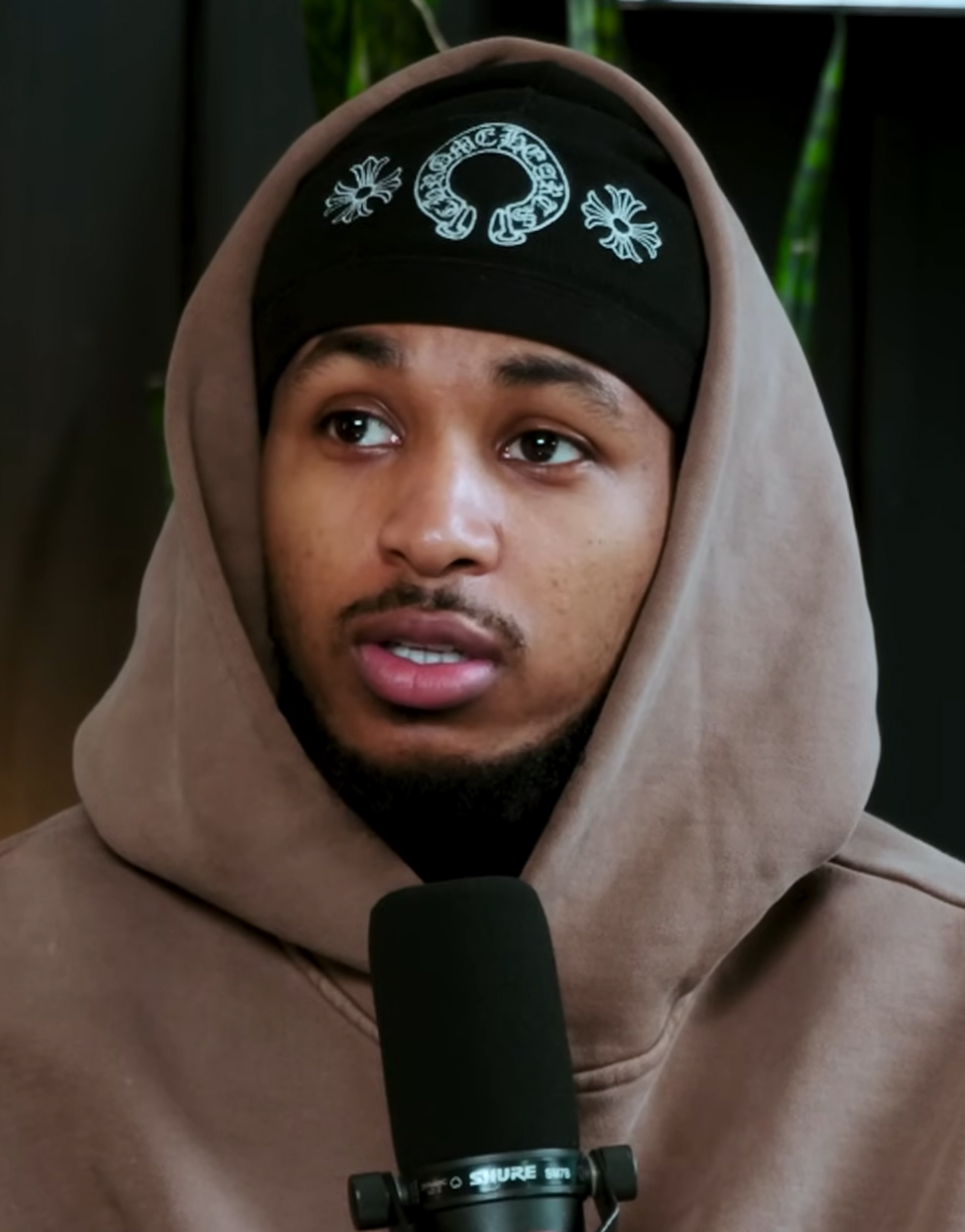
- Granberry in 2025

Background information
- Also known as: PontiacMadeDDG • Moo
- Born: Darryl Dwayne Granberry Jr. October 10, 1997 (age 29); Pontiac, Michigan, U.S.
- Education: Central Michigan University (dropped out)
- Genres: Midwestern hip-hop; trap; pop rap
- Occupations: Rapper; singer; songwriter; YouTuber; online streamer; actor
- Years active: 2015–present
- Labels: Epic; Zooted
- Partner: Halle Bailey (2021–2024)
- Children: 1

Twitch information
- Channel: DDG
- Followers: 2.5 million

YouTube information
- Channels: DDG (Music); DDG Live; PontiacMadeDDG VLOGS; DDG Snaps
- Years active: 2014–present
- Genres: Gaming, vlogs, pranks
- Subscribers: 4.4 million (DDG Live); 3.28 million (DDG Music); 3.6 million (PontiacMadeDDG VLOGS); 1.53 million (DDG Snaps)
- Views: 945 million (DDG Music); 782 million (DDG Live); 700 million (PontiacMadeDDG VLOGS)
- Last updated: November 1st, 2026

Darryl Dwayne Granberry Jr. (born October 10, 1997), known professionally by his initials DDG, Is an American YouTuber, online streamer and rapper. He started making videos in 2014, and briefly attended Central Michigan University. He dropped out of college within a year to focus on his YouTube career.

In 2018, Granberry signed with Epic Records and co-founded his own record label Zooted Music two years later with managers Eric O'Connor and Dimitri Hurt. His 2020 single, "Moonwalking in Calabasas" (remixed featuring Blueface), entered the Billboard Hot 100 and received double platinum certification by the Recording Industry Association of America (RIAA).

Granberry made his boxing debut against Nate Wyatt in June 2021 at the YouTubers vs. TikTokers event, where he defeated Wyatt by unanimous decision.

== Early life ==
Darryl Dwayne Granberry Jr. was born in Pontiac, Michigan. He attended International Tech Academy, where he was class valedictorian. After graduating from high school, he enrolled at Central Michigan University, but dropped out shortly before entering his sophomore year, after one of his videos went viral. After dropping out of Central Michigan, he moved to Hollywood, California, to be a full-time entertainer.

== Career ==
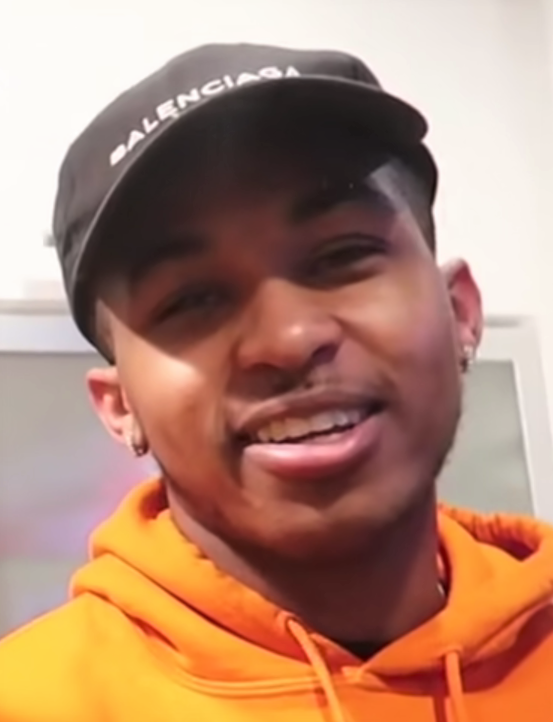
Granberry in 2018

DDG was interested in music at a young age. He made music as a child in the studio where his father was an audio engineer. His early music included a diss track to Lil Yachty, which was called "Big Boat". DDG released two songs in 2016 titled "Balenciagas" and "Free Parties", both produced by Zaytoven. He also teamed up with Famous Dex for the song "Lettuce". The track was initially released on DDG's YouTube channel and had 500,000 views in one hour, causing WorldstarHipHop to contact DDG to allow them to exclusively release the video. On November 23, 2017, DDG released a single, "Givenchy", off his debut EP, Take Me Serious. It received over 25 million views on YouTube. Complex identified "Givenchy" as a song "Bout to Blow in 2018". On March 17, 2018, DDG released Take Me Serious. After the release of "Lettuce", he was contacted by major record labels, and in June 2018 signed a record deal with Epic Records.

On June 1, 2018, DDG released the single "Arguments", which was certified Gold by the RIAA on April 15, 2020. On March 22, 2019, he released his second EP, Sorry 4 the Hold Up. He released a music video for the song "Hold Up" from the EP, featuring Queen Naija, and it received over 15 million views on YouTube. On September 20, 2019, he released "Push", the first single off his debut album, Valedictorian. DDG released the album on November 1, 2019.

On July 24, 2020, he released his single "Moonwalking in Calabasas", which later received two remixes, the first featuring Blueface and the second featuring YG. It became DDG's first song to enter the Billboard Hot 100, peaking at number 82. The song was certified platinum on June 3, 2021. DDG and record producer OG Parker released the single "Money Long" featuring 42 Dugg on February 26, 2021. DDG released a collaborative mixtape with OG Parker, Die 4 Respect on March 19, 2021. It peaked at number 61 on the Billboard 200. On June 16, 2021, he was fan-voted to the tenth spot for the 2021 XXL Freshman List.

On February 18, 2022, DDG released his single "Elon Musk," which featured American-rapper Gunna. According to an interview with Complex Music, the single was a nod to DDG's admiration for the multi-billionaire business magnate and entrepreneur Musk, as well as their similar interests in space travel. According to Forbes, DDG was the first rapper to shoot a music video with NASA's zero gravity training, emulating a space mission.

On September 30, 2022, he released a second studio album, It's Not Me It's You, with features from Gunna, NLE Choppa, Polo G, Kevin Gates and Babyface Ray.

In 2022, it was announced that DDG had made the Forbes 2023 30 Under 30 list for music.

In 2023, DDG followed his second studio album It's Not Me It's You with Maybe It's Me..., and went on to release Blame the Chat in 2025.

In 2014, DDG's 21-year-old brother, Darion Breckenridge, was shot and killed inside his car; the killers were never caught. Four years later, in a 2018 interview on DJ Vlad's YouTube channel, DDG said he knows who killed his brother. The murder of his brother motivated DDG to reject "street life" and pursue more creative endeavors.

From 2020 to 2021, DDG dated female rapper and internet personality Rubi Rose.

In 2022, DDG and singer Halle Bailey confirmed they were in a relationship. In 2024, the pair announced the birth of their son, born on December 22, 2023. On October 3, 2024, DDG announced that he and Bailey had broken up after almost three years of dating, but would continue to raise their son together. In May 2025, Bailey was granted a restraining order against Granberry, after she alleged he had abused her. She was then given temporary legal and physical custody of their son. In June 2025, DDG likewise filed a restraining order of his own and additionally requested that Bailey be barred from traveling internationally with their son on the grounds that she posed a risk to herself and others. While the court did grant him a temporary restraining order, the latter request was denied.

== Discography ==
=== Studio albums ===
List of studio albums, with selected details and chart positions
Title	Album details	Peak chart positions		
Title	Album details	US	US R&B/HH	US Rap
Valedictorian	Released: November 1, 2019; Label: Epic; Format: Digital download, streaming	—	—	—
It's Not Me It's You	Released: September 30, 2022; Label: Epic; Format: Digital download, streaming	133	—	—
Maybe It's Me...	Released: July 14, 2023; Label: Epic; Format: Digital download, streaming	—	—	—
Blame the Chat	Released: May 2, 2025; Label: Epic; Format: Digital download, streaming	131	41	—
Moo	Released: October 10, 2025; Label: Epic; Format: Digital download, streaming	—	—	—
Don't Overthink It	Released: November 30, 2025; Label: Self-released; Format: Digital download, streaming	—	—	—
Hit-A-Thon	Released: September 25, 2026; Label: Epic; Format: Digital download, streaming	141	46	24

=== Mixtapes ===
List of mixtapes, with selected details and chart positions
Title	Mixtape details	Peak chart positions	
Title	Mixtape details	US	US R&B/HH
Die 4 Respect (with OG Parker)	Released: March 19, 2021; Label: Epic; Format: Digital download, streaming	61	34

=== Extended plays ===
List of extended plays, with selected details
Title	EP details
Take Me Serious	Released: March 17, 2018; Label: Self-released; Format: Digital download, streaming
Sorry 4 the Hold Up	Released: March 22, 2019; Label: Epic; Format: Digital download, streaming
Handling Business	Released: December 13, 2024; Label: Epic; Format: Digital download, streaming

=== Singles ===
==== As lead artist ====
List of singles as lead artist
Title	Year	Peak chart positions				Certifications	Album(s)
Title	Year	US	US R&B /HH	CAN	WW	Certifications	Album(s)
"Balenciagas"	2016	—	—	—	—		Non-album singles
"Free Parties"	2016	—	—	—	—		Non-album singles
"The Reals"	2017	—	—	—	—		Non-album singles
"No Pockets"	2017	—	—	—	—		Non-album singles
"Lettuce" (featuring Famous Dex)	2017	—	—	—	—		Non-album singles
"Take Me Serious"	2017	—	—	—	—		Take Me Serious
"Givenchy"	2017	—	—	—	—		Take Me Serious
"Hood Santa"	2017	—	—	—	—		Non-album singles
"On My Own"	2018	—	—	—	—		Non-album singles
"Bank"	2018	—	—	—	—		Take Me Serious
"Arguments"	2018	—	—	—	—	RIAA: Gold	Valedictorian
"No Label"	2018	—	—	—	—		Non-album singles
"Young, Rich & Black"	2018	—	—	—	—		Non-album singles
"Run It Up" (featuring YBN Nahmir, G Herbo, and Blac Youngsta)	2018	—	—	—	—		Sorry 4 the Hold Up and Valedictorian
"Accountant"	2018	—	—	—	—		Non-album single
"Hold Up" (featuring Queen Naija)	2019	—	—	—	—		Sorry 4 the Hold Up and Valedictorian
"13"	2019	—	—	—	—		Non-album single
"Push"	2019	—	—	—	—		Valedictorian
"Red Light!" (with DC the Don and YBN Almighty Jay)	2020	—	—	—	—		Come as You Are
"Cotton Mouth"	2020	—	—	—	—		Non-album singles
"Escape"	2020	—	—	—	—		Non-album singles
"Toxic"	2020	—	—	—	—		Non-album singles
"Pull Up" (with Sad Frosty)	2020	—	—	—	—		Happy Cult
"OD!"	2020	—	—	—	—		Non-album singles
"New Celine" (with Paidway T.O)	2020	—	—	—	—		Non-album singles
"Exotics"	2020	—	—	—	—		Non-album singles
"Case"	2020	—	—	—	—		Non-album singles
"She Cheated"	2020	—	—	—	—		Non-album singles
"Well Off"	2020	—	—	—	—		Non-album singles
"Moonwalking in Calabasas" (solo or featuring Blueface or YG)	2020	81	26	72	185	RIAA: 2× Platinum; BPI: Silver; MC: Gold; RMNZ: Platinum	Die 4 Respect
"Tony Montana" (with DJ K.i.D)	2020	—	—	—	—		Non-album single
"Money Long" (with OG Parker featuring 42 Dugg)	2021	—	—	—	—		Die 4 Respect
"Rule #1" (with OG Parker featuring Lil Yachty)	2021	—	—	—	—		Die 4 Respect
"No Kizzy" (with Paidway T.O)	2021	—	—	—	—		Non-album singles
"Lusted"	2021	—	—	—	—		Non-album singles
"If I Go Broke"	2021	—	—	—	—		Non-album singles
"Rucci"	2021	—	—	—	—		Non-album singles
"Elon Musk" (featuring Gunna)	2022	— (Note: "Elon Musk" did not enter the Billboard Hot 100, but peaked at number 12 on the Bubbling Under Hot 100 Singles chart.)	48	—	—		It's Not Me It's You
"Meat This" (with Blueface)	2022	—	—	—	—		Non-album single
"Storyteller"	2022	—	—	—	—		It's Not Me It's You
"Stay in My Circle"	2022	—	—	—	—		It's Not Me It's You
"Rodeo"	2022	—	—	—	—		Non-album single
"If I Want You"	2022	—	—	—	—		It's Not Me It's You
"9 Lives" (featuring Polo G and NLE Choppa)	2022	—	50	—	—		It's Not Me It's You
"I'm Geekin" (solo or featuring Luh Tyler)	2023	— (Note: "I'm Geekin" did not enter the Billboard Hot 100, but peaked at number two on the Bubbling Under Hot 100 Singles chart.)	33	—	—	RIAA: Gold	Maybe It's Me...
"Pink Dreads" (with PlaqueBoyMax)	2024	— (Note: "Pink Dreads" did not enter the Billboard Hot 100, but peaked at number 10 on the Bubbling Under Hot 100 Singles chart.)	46	—	—		Blame the Chat
"The Method"	2025	—	—	—	—		Non-album single
"Motion" (with DaBaby)	2025	—	—	—	—		Blame the Chat
"That's My Ball"	2025	—	—	—	—		Non-album singles
"Tight End"	2025	—	—	—	—		Non-album singles
"No Dreads" (with PlaqueBoyMax)	2025	—	—	—	—		Moo
"Round & Round" (with 42 Dugg, Pluto, Bankroll Ni and SMJ)	2026	—	38	—	—		Hit-A-Thon

==== As featured artist ====
Title	Year	Album
"Time Is Money" (Mystic featuring DDG)	2017	Non-album singles
"Ice Ice" (Blake featuring DDG)	2018	Non-album singles
"Better Days" (Paidway T.O featuring DDG)	2019	Non-album singles
"Done wit It" (LV The Artist featuring DDG)	2020	Non-album singles
"Wraith" (Ron Suno featuring DDG)	2020	Jokes Up
"Why Would You Leave" (Paidway T.O featuring DDG)	2020	Non-album singles
"On Your Mind" (Autumn Corin featuring DDG)	2020	Non-album singles
"Tony Montana" (DJ K.i.D featuring DDG)	2020	Non-album singles
"BGC" (Blueface featuring DDG)	2021	Non-album singles
"Get Money" (Melvoni featuring DDG and Tyla Yaweh)	2021	Return to Sender
"Simon Says" (Baby Rich featuring DDG)	2021	Non-album single
"Choosy" (YBN Almighty Jay featuring DDG)	2021	Almighty: The EP
"Zack & Cody" (2KBABY featuring DDG)	2021	First Quarter
"Rich as Us" (Taliban Glizzy featuring DDG)	2021	Non-album singles
"Worth It" (Traetwothree featuring DDG)	2021	Non-album singles
"Trap Santa" (Nakkia Gold featuring DDG)	2021	Non-album singles

=== Other certified songs ===
Title	Year	Certifications	Album(s)
"Hood Melody" (with OG Parker featuring YoungBoy Never Broke Again)	2021	RIAA: Gold	Die 4 Respect

=== Guest appearances ===
List of non-single guest appearances, with other performing artists
Title	Year	Other artist(s)	Album
"Brinks Truck"	2019	B.Lou	XX Mixtape Vol.1 - Breaking the Internet
"2 Girlfriends"	2019	Baby Rich	XX Mixtape Vol.1 - Breaking the Internet
"Watch This"	2019	B.Lou	BOW
"She Ain't Me"	2020	Ceraadi	#GRWM
"Honey Pack (Remix)"	2021	Bfb Da Packman, Lil Yachty	Fat Niggas Need Love Too
"Yellow Tape"	2021	D3szn	4Hunnid Presents: Gang Affiliated
"Astronaut in the Ocean (Remix)"	2021	Masked Wolf, G-Eazy	—N/a
"Fr Fr"	2021	Deno	Boy Meets World
"No Favours"	2021	Lord Afrixana	Godfather of Harlem: Season 2 Soundtrack
"Cabo (Remix)"	2021	Bankrol Hayden, Ka$hdami	—N/a
"Beethoven (Remix)"	2021	Kenndog	—N/a

== Filmography ==
Year	Title	Role	Notes	Ref.
2025	Inside	Contestant	Runner-up; series 2	

== Awards and nominations ==
Awards and nominations for DDG
Award	Year	Category	Nominated Work	Result	Ref.
The Streamer Awards	2025	Best Music Streamer	—N/a	Nominated	
The Streamer Awards	2025	Best Breakout Streamer	—N/a	Nominated	
The Streamer Awards	2026	Best Music Streamer	—N/a	Pending	
The Streamer Awards	2026	Best Marathon Stream	Hit-A-Thon	Pending	

== Boxing record ==
=== Exhibition ===
1 fight	1 win	0 losses
By decision	1	0

No.	Result	Record	Opponent	Type	Round, time	Date	Location	Notes
1	Win	1–0	Nate Wyatt	UD	5	June 12, 2021	(United States) Hard Rock Stadium, Miami Gardens, Florida, U.S.	
