= Ron Suno =

American rapper (born 2000)

- Also known as: Ron Buno, mo
- Born: Keron Joel Foriest; August 3, 2000 (age 26); Co-op City, Bronx, New York, U.S.
- Origin: Bronx, New York City
- Genres: Hip hop; drill music
- Occupations: rapper, songwriter
- Years active: 2017–present
- Labels: SBL Music / UnitedMasters, EMPIRE

Keron Joel Foriest (born August 3, 2000), known by his stage name Ron Suno, is an American rapper and songwriter. In June 2020, Suno released his debut studio album, Swag Like Mike, dedicated to entertainment figures such as Michael Jordan, Mike Tyson, and Michael Jackson, who inspired his art.

== Early life ==
Keron Foriest was born on August 3, 2000, and raised in Co-op City, a cooperative housing development in the northeast section of the Bronx alongside rappers Howiee OO, ZayBinSteppin, Lil Mav etc. Suno started entertaining at the age of 13 when he began recording drill rap songs in a tiny home studio in the Bronx but only gained online audience attention with his comedy on social media platforms such as YouTube, Instagram and TikTok. In 2017, he started a social media trend #WeaveChallenge, which helped him gain over half a million Instagram followers within months.

== Music career ==
In early 2019, Ron began building fans base as a drill rapper by releasing music videos such as "With My Crew", "Party on Jump" and his seven-song EP, New Boss, on YouTube and promoting them on Instagram. His musical breakthrough came in October 2019 with the release of a hit song and video "Pinnochio", an upbeat with a danceable flow receiving 15 million views on TikTok, over 9 million on YouTube with about 6 million plays on Spotify; a remix of the song was later released, featuring Los Angeles musician Blueface. In February 2020, Suno released a single and music video, "Spider-Man" featuring fellow New York rapper Fivio Foreign.

In June 2020, amid the COVID-19 pandemic, Suno released Swag Like Mike, featuring 5 artists. He released "Wraith' featuring DDG. In October 2020, Suno dropped a single "Netflix" in audio and visual. In November 2020, NBA 2K League affiliate of the Atlanta Hawks, known as The Hawks Talon Gaming Club, included Suno as one of the celebrity guests on its new virtual game show where fans could play against their favorite celebrities.

== Discography ==
=== Studio albums ===
List of albums, with selected details
Title	Album details
New Boss	Released: July 9, 2019; Label: SBL Music Group; Format: Streaming (via Deezer)
Swag Like Mike	Released: June 19, 2020; Label: SBL Music, UnitedMasters; Format: Digital download
Jokes Up	Released: July 9, 2021; Label: SBL Music, Empire; Format: Digital download
Suno Mode	Released: August 5, 2022; Label: SBL Music, Empire; Format: Digital download
It's My Time	Released: February 9, 2023; Label: SBL Music, Empire; Format: Digital download

=== Collaborative albums ===
List of albums, with selected details
Title	Album details
Say Dat (with Dusty Locane, Rah Swish and OnPointLikeOP)	Released: September 23, 2022; Label: 95MM; Format: Digital download
