= Outside (OG Bobby Billions song) =

Single by OG Bobby Billions

- Cover art of the remix with MO3

Single by OG Bobby Billions

from the album Holy Goat
- Released: April 12, 2020
- Length: 2:04
- Label: Billionaire; Empire
- Songwriter: OG Bobby Billions
- Producer: DeeMarc

Music video
- "Outside" on YouTube
- "Outside (with MO3)" on YouTube
- "Outside (with Blueface)" on YouTube

Remix cover
- Cover art of the remix with Blueface

"Outside" is a song by American rapper OG Bobby Billions and the lead single from his debut studio album Holy Goat (2020). Two official remixes of the song have since been released; the first is with American rapper MO3 and the second is with American rapper Blueface.

== Background and composition ==
The song was originally not written for Holy Goat, but was a last-minute addition to the album. According to OG Bobby Billions, some of his friends wanted him to add one more song to the album, after which he wrote "Outside" in two hours. It is a gospel-inspired song, with production consisting of keyboard and guitar.

== Remixes ==
=== MO3 ===
The first official remix is a collaboration with MO3 and was released posthumously on March 19, 2021, as the second single from MO3's second studio album Shottaz 4Eva (2021). It finds MO3 warning his enemies, as well as looking for forgiveness and acknowledging his flaws, admitting he is not always on a righteous path.

A music video premiered alongside the remix. Directed by Prophecy, it shows MO3's friends and family gathering to mourn his death and honor his memory, in addition to footage of MO3 joking around with friends, recording music at the studio, and performing.

=== Blueface ===
The second official remix is a collaboration with Blueface and titled "Outside (Better Days)". It was released on May 26, 2021. A contrast to his usual musical style, the song finds Blueface rapping on beat with introspective and serious lyrics.

A music video premiered alongside the remix. Directed by Reel Goats, it sees OG Bobby Billions and Blueface at a funeral in a church, where a choir is performing, and also with a crowd of people who are all dressed in black.

== Charts ==
=== Remix with MO3 ===
Chart performance for "Outside"
Chart (2021)	Peak position
US Billboard Hot 100	92
US Hot R&B/Hip-Hop Songs (Billboard)	32

=== Remix with Blueface ===
Chart performance for "Outside (Better Days)"
Chart (2021)	Peak position
New Zealand Hot Singles (RMNZ)	12
US Bubbling Under Hot 100 (Billboard)	19

== Certifications ==
=== Remix with MO3 ===
Region	Certification	Certified units/sales
United States (RIAA)	2× Platinum	2,000,000^{‡}
^{‡} Sales+streaming figures based on certification alone.

=== Remix with Blueface ===
Region	Certification	Certified units/sales
United States (RIAA)	Gold	500,000^{‡}
^{‡} Sales+streaming figures based on certification alone.
