= Moonwalking in Calabasas =

2020 song by DDG

Single by DDG
- Released: July 24, 2020
- Genre: Hip hop
- Length: 2:44
- Label: Epic
- Songwriters: Darryl Granberry, Jr.; Devin Miller
- Producer: DevIsLit

DDG singles chronology
"Well Off" (2020)	"Moonwalking in Calabasas" (2020)

Music video
- "Moonwalking in Calabasas" on YouTube

"Moonwalking in Calabasas" is a song by American rapper and YouTuber DDG. It was released on July 24, 2020, by Epic Records.

The music video first premiered on July 26, 2020 on his rap YouTube channel and was directed and shot by LewisYouNasty.

== Background and composition ==
The song is produced by DevIsLit and samples "Too Comfortable" by Future and interpolates "OD" by DDG.

The song goes in-depth about DDG's struggle to make a living by doing skits, and achieving success while doing YouTube as well as doing music. It also includes a diss towards rival YouTuber SoLLUMINATI.

== Remix versions ==
=== Blueface remix ===
"Moonwalking in Calabasas (Remix)"

Single by DDG featuring Blueface

from the album Die 4 Respect
- Released: August 18, 2020
- Genre: Hip hop
- Length: 2:50
- Label: Epic
- Songwriters: Darryl Granberry, Jr.; Johnathan Porter; Devin Miller
- Producer: DevIsLit

Blueface singles chronology
"Tour" (2020)	"Moonwalking in Calabasas (Remix)" (2020)	"Curvy" (2020)

Music video
- "Moonwalking in Calabasas (Remix)" on YouTube

A remix version featuring rapper Blueface was released on August 18, 2020. DDG and Blueface have been close after meeting at a venue in 2019, with the song marking their first collaboration together. Blueface shared the clip of the song in his Instagram, with DDG tweeting "I guess I’m finna drop the remix today" on August 18.

The music video was released on August 22 and amassed over 30 million views as of January 2021. It later ended up in his collaborative mixtape "Die 4 Respect" with OG Parker as the first single and bonus track.

=== YG remix ===
On December 18, 2020, a second remix version with rapper YG was released, with YG giving two more verses. DDG thanked both Blueface and YG when the song charted on the Billboard Hot 100.

== Charts ==
=== Weekly charts ===
Weekly chart performance for "Moonwalking in Calabasas"
Chart (2020–2021)	Peak position
Canada Hot 100 (Billboard)	72
Global 200 (Billboard)	185
US Billboard Hot 100	81
US Hot R&B/Hip-Hop Songs (Billboard)	26
US Rhythmic Airplay (Billboard)	23

=== Year-end charts ===
Year-end chart performance for "Moonwalking in Calabasas"
Chart (2021)	Position
US Hot R&B/Hip-Hop Songs (Billboard)	73

== Certifications ==
Certifications for "Moonwalking in Calabasas"
Region	Certification	Certified units/sales
Canada (Music Canada)	Gold	40,000^{‡}
United Kingdom (BPI)	Silver	200,000^{‡}
United States (RIAA)	2× Platinum	2,000,000^{‡}
^{‡} Sales+streaming figures based on certification alone.
