= Paralyzed (Sueco song) =

2021 single by Sueco

Single by Sueco

from the album It Was Fun While It Lasted
- Released: August 13, 2021
- Genre: Pop-punk; emo rap
- Length: 2:42
- Label: Atlantic
- Songwriters: Andrew Migliore; Colin Brittain; David Wilson; John Feldmann; William Henry Schultz
- Producers: Colin Brittain; John Feldmann; No Love For The Middle Child; Dwilly

Sueco singles chronology
| "SOS" (2021) | "Paralyzed" (2021) | "Sober / Hungover" (2021) |

Music video
- "Paralyzed" on YouTube

"Paralyzed" is a song by American rapper and singer Sueco. It was released on August 13, 2021, via Atlantic Records. Due to Internet memes on TikTok, the song has garnered over 30 million streams, and reached number one on the Spotify US 50 Viral chart. The song appears on Sueco's studio album It Was Fun While It Lasted.

== Music video ==
The music video was released on September 10, 2021, and directed by Alex Bittan, who also shoots for Panic! at the Disco, Paramore and Twenty One Pilots. It describes a story about a girl "goes to a Sueco show", it holds a "drag race scene from Grease", and the girl "runs into someone who has supposedly emotionally abused her, and she eventually gives in to the music, getting over this person by crowd-surfing at the Sueco show."

== Chart performance ==
It reached number 65 on the US Billboard Hot 100 and number eight on the Billboard Hot Rock & Alternative Songs chart, becoming Sueco's first and highest entry.

== Credits and personnel ==
Credits adapted from Tidal.

- Colin Brittain – producer, mixer, writer
- Dwilly – producer
- John Feldmann – producer, writer
- No Love For The Middle Child – producer
- Emerson Mancini – Mastering
- Andrew Migliore – writer
- David Wilson – writer
- William Henry Schultz – writer

== Charts ==
=== Weekly charts ===
Chart performance for "Paralyzed"
| Chart (2021) | Peak position |
|---|---|
| Canada (Canadian Hot 100) | 79 |
| Global 200 (Billboard) | 109 |
| New Zealand Hot Singles (RMNZ) | 14 |
| US Billboard Hot 100 | 65 |
| US Hot Rock & Alternative Songs (Billboard) | 8 |

=== Year-end charts ===
Year-end chart performance for "Paralyzed"
| Chart (2021) | Position |
|---|---|
| US Hot Rock & Alternative Songs (Billboard) | 38 |

== Certifications ==
Certifications for "Paralyzed"
| Region | Certification | Certified units/sales |
|---|---|---|
| Australia (ARIA) | Gold | 35,000^{‡} |
| Canada (Music Canada) | Gold | 40,000^{‡} |
| United States (RIAA) | Gold | 500,000^{‡} |
^{‡} Sales+streaming figures based on certification alone.

== Release history ==
Release history for "Paralyzed"
| Region | Date | Format | Label | Ref. |
|---|---|---|---|---|
| Various | August 13, 2021 | Digital download; streaming | Atlantic | |
| United States | September 14, 2021 | Alternative radio | Atlantic | |
