= WOO Forever =

Mixtape by Rah Swish
- Released: June 26, 2020
- Recorded: 2019–2020
- Genre: Hip hop; trap; Brooklyn drill; drill
- Length: 26:44
- Label: Empire; WOO Entertainment
- Producer: A-Lau; Clay "Krucial" Perry III; H20; Hassy Beats; JBangaBeats; JetzCookin; MelodicDesert; Rah Swish; Sinister; Szamz; Trackmasters

Rah Swish chronology
Look What They Started (2019)	WOO Forever (2020)	Mayor Of The Streets (2021)

Singles from WOO Forever
- 1. "Treeshin" Released: November 11, 2019; 2. "WOO Forever" Released: April 29, 2020; 3. "Tongue Out (Treeshin 2)" Released: June 18, 2020

WOO Forever is the second mixtape by American drill artist Rah Swish. The mixtape was released on June 26, 2020, by Empire and WOO Entertainment. The mixtape features guest appearances from Curly Savv, Jay Gwuapo and an uncredited appearance from Pop Smoke.

== Singles ==
The lead single, "Treeshin'" was released on November 11, 2019. The song also acted as the lead single to Wilks' debut mixtape Look What They Started (2019). The second single "WOO Forever" was released on April 29, 2020. The third and final single, "Tongue Out (Treeshin 2)", the sequel to "Treeshin'", was released on June 18, 2020. On July 2, 2020, album track "Aim It" was lauded as "[t]he must-hear rap song of the day" by Pitchfork writer Sheldon Pearce.

== Track listing ==
No.	Title	Writer(s)	Producer(s)	Length
1.	"Talk with the WOOs (Intro)"	Rahlique Wilks; Bashar Jackson	Rah Swish	0:35
2.	"Feel Like Pop"	Wilks; H20; Clay "Krucial" Perry III	H20; Clay "Krucial" Perry III	2:06
3.	"WOO Forever"	Wilks; Sinister; Szamz	Sinister; Szamz	2:25
4.	"Hustlin"	Wilks; Javier Scheuermann	JBangaBeats	2:54
5.	"Aim It" (featuring Curly Savv)	Wilks; Curly Savv; Jetz Cookin	Jetz Cokin	2:25
6.	"T&B"	Wilks; H20	H20	2:12
7.	"Slide Show"	Wilks; A-Lau	A-Lau	2:55
8.	"We Can Do It"	Wilks; Trackmasters	Trackmasters	2:40
9.	"Tongue Out (Treeshin 2)"	Wilks; Melodic Desert; H20; Clay "Krucial" Perry III	Melodic Desert; H20; Clay "Krucial" Perry III	2:16
10.	"Treeshin'"	Wilks; Hassy Beats	Hassy Beats	3:16
11.	"WOO Forever (Remix)" (featuring Jay Gwuapo)	Wilks; Jayden Morgan; Sinister; Szamz	Sinister; Szamz	2:56
Total length:				26:44
