= Rah Swish =

American rapper (born 1997)

- Also known as: Big Woo
- Born: Rahlique Devawn Wilks; December 4, 1997 (age 28); Canarsie, Brooklyn, New York, U.S.
- Genres: Hip Hop; Brooklyn drill
- Occupations: Rapper; songwriter
- Years active: 2015–present

Rahlique Devawn Wilks (born December 4, 1997), known professionally as Rah Swish, is an American rapper born and raised in Canarsie, Brooklyn. He is known for the hit single "Brush Em" with Pop Smoke which peaked number 1 on the Bubbling Under Hot 100 Billboard chart 2021.

== Early life ==
Rahlique Devawn Wilks was born on December 4, 1997, in Brooklyn, New York City, in the same area as fellow WOO member Pop Smoke. He grew up listening to 50 Cent, Jay-Z, The Notorious B.I.G. and Lil Wayne. He said in an interview with AllHipHop "It was cool growing up. You don't really know nothing else so you accept what you're in. It was calm, it was regular. Street life, young black man growing up in the hood. Regular shit." when asked about growing up in Canarsie, Brooklyn. Swish started rapping in 2015 on a song called 50 Bars Pt. 1 and began to gain buzz around Brooklyn. "From 2015 on, alright I'm a rapper now." Swish met Pop Smoke in the street when they were doing "street shit", he said in the same AllHipHop interview " We met on the block. I was rapping before him. Once he started rapping, we kept clicking together more and more. It was a vibe. You see Pop, you see Rah."

== Music career ==
He has worked with Fetty Luciano, Pop Smoke, Smokepurpp, Dusty Locane, Ron Suno, Rowdy Rebel, Fivio Foreign and many other notable rappers.

As of August 2023 he has released five mixtapes, one collaborative album and 42 singles (including 13 as a featured artist).

Wilks released his debut Mixtape Look What They Started on December 4, 2019. The mixtape was supported by one single and consists of 11 songs. The original release of the mixtape featured Pop Smoke on the track "Load It" until the verse was removed and added to Pop Smoke's song "AP". The mixtape was re-released without his verse.

Wilks released his second Mixtape WOO Forever on June 26, 2020. The tape featured guest appearances from Curly Savv, Jay Gwuapo and featured a phone call from Pop Smoke on the intro. The mixtape was supported by three singles, one of which was also a single for Look What They Started. The mixtape consists of 11 songs. On November 6, 2020, Wilks released a single titled 'Watchu Like' with DreamDoll, the song was released with a music video and is one of his top streamed songs.

His third mixtape Mayor of the Streets was released on June 16, 2021, and featured appearances from Smokepurpp, Ron Suno, Leeky G Bando, Fetty Luciano and Young Costamado. The mixtape was supported by three singles and consists of 10 songs.

Wilks released the collaborative mixtape Say Dat alongside Dusty Locane, Ron Suno and OnPointLikeOP on September 23, 2022, which consists of 8 songs. Wilks then went onto release his fourth mixtape The Old Me on December 16, 2022, which was supported by one single and consists of 7 songs.

Wilks released his fifth mixtape 9 Shots in the Ruger on June 9, 2023. The mixtape was supported by one single and featured appearances from Sdot Go, Ron Suno, Curly Savv, Damedot and OnPointLikeOP. This mixtape consists of 9 songs.

== Discography ==
=== Collaborative mixtapes ===
List of mixtapes, with selected details
Title	Details
Say Dat (with Dusty Locane, Ron Suno and OnPointLikeOP)	Released: September 23, 2022; Label: Say Dat, Empire; Format: Digital download, streaming

=== Mixtapes ===
Title	Details
Look What They Started	Released: December 4, 2019; Labels: WOO Entertainment, Empire; Format: digital download, streaming
WOO Forever	Released: June 26, 2020; Label: WOO Entertainment, Empire; Format: digital download, streaming
Mayor of the Streets	Released: June 16, 2021; Label: WOO Entertainment, Empire; Format: digital download, streaming
The Old Me	Released: December 16, 2022; Labels: 20Nyne Entertainment, Empire; Format: digital download, streaming
9 Shots in the Ruger	Released: June 9, 2023; Label: 20Nyne Entertainment, Empire; Format: digital download, streaming
Elevator Music	Released: May 24, 2024; Label: 20Nyne Entertainment, Empire; Format: digital download, streaming

=== Singles ===
==== As lead artist ====
List of singles as a lead artist, with selected chart positions, showing year released and album name
Title	Year	Peak chart positions	Album
Title	Year	US	Album
"Debo"	2017	—	Non-album singles
"They Gotta Know"	2018	—	Non-album singles
"This N' That"	2018	—	Non-album singles
"How We Got It" (with Fetty Luciano)	2018	—	Non-album singles
"PSA"	2018	—	Non-album singles
"Lifestyle"	2018	—	Non-album singles
"Changing Up"	2019	—	Non-album singles
"Exposing Me" (featuring Curly Savv)	2019	—	Non-album singles
"Hold On Wait" (featuring Curly Savv)	2019	—	Non-album singles
"Party Done"	2019	—	Non-album singles
"No Clue"	2019	—	Non-album singles
"Treeshin'"	2019	—	Look What They Started and WOO Forever
"Perc Hit" (with O Racks)	2020	—	Non-album singles
"Too Much" (featuring Bizzy Banks)	2020	—	Non-album singles
"WarTime"	2020	—	Non-album singles
"WOO Forever"	2020	—	WOO Forever
"Tongue Out (Treeshin 2)"	2020	—	WOO Forever
"50 Bars, Pt.4"	2020	—	Non-album singles
"Watchu Like" (with DreamDoll)	2020	—	Non-album singles
"D&G" (featuring Zay G)	2021	—	Non-album singles
"A Year Ago"	2021	—	Non-album singles
"Warm Ups" (featuring Leeky G Bando)	2021	—	Mayor of the Streets
"On a Mission" (featuring Dread Woo)	2021	—	Non-album single
"WOO Back"	2021	—	Mayor of the Streets
"WOO It Again"	2021	—	Mayor of the Streets
"Tell 'Em"	2022	—	The Old Me
"Rolling Stone" (featuring Don Q)	2022	—	Non-album singles
"Double Cup"	2022	—	Non-album singles
"Sprinter Van"	2023	—	9 Shots in the Ruger
"I Am Not Human"	2023	—	Elevator Music
"Who Am I"	2024	—	Elevator Music
"BT" (with Rowdy Rebel)	2024	—	Elevator Music
"Decline" (with MRG)	2024	—	Non-album singles
"How I'm Living" (with Maino featuring Fivio Foreign)	2024	—	Non-album singles

==== As featured artist ====
List of singles as a lead artist, with selected chart positions, showing year released and album name
Title	Year	Peak chart positions	Album
Title	Year	US	Album
"Sue Me" (Tony Seltzer and A Lau featuring Rah Swish)	2020	—	Avenues
"MOP" (DJ Drewski featuring Rah Swish and Ron Suno)	2020	—	Seat at the Table
"S.M.D Pt.1" (icyslug featuring Rah Swish and Smoove'L)	2020	—	Non-album single
"War" (MoneyMarr featuring Rah Swish)	2020	—	Millionaire Mindset
"Opps" (Drippy featuring Rah Swish & Fetty Wap)	2020	—	Non-album singles
"Finesser" (TouchMoney Patek and TouchMoney Kenzo featuring Rah Swish)	2021	—	Non-album singles
"Double 360" (Stoop Lauren featuring Rah Swish)	2021	—	Non-album singles
"No Average" (Gusto featuring Rah Swish)	2021	—	Non-album singles
"Stretch Em" (EMoneyOne11 featuring Rah Swish)	2021	—	Non-album singles
"Any Second" (Ron Suno featuring Rah Swish)	2022	—	Non-album singles
"Always Workin" (OnPointLikeOP featuring Rah Swish)	2022	—	Non-album singles
"Shoes" (Ron Suno featuring Rah Swish and Dusty Locane)	2022	—	Suno Mode
"Seeing Red" (7evil7ins featuring Dusty Locane and Rah Swish)	2022	—	Non-album single

=== Other charted and certified songs ===
List of charted songs, showing year released and album name
Title	Year	Peak chart positions		Album
Title	Year	US R&B /HH	CAN	Album
"Brush Em" (Pop Smoke featuring Rah Swish)	2021	40	53	Faith

=== Guest appearances ===
List of non-single guest appearances, with other performing artists, showing year released and album name
Title	Year	Other artists	Album
"Got It 4 Low"	2018	Poppa Da Don	Fucc Wit da Cuz Vol.2
"Hideout"	2020	Curly Savv	Glocky Szn
"The Most"	2020	Sniper Lewis	The HotBread Tape 2
"Shake the Town"	2021	Klass Murda	Motivated
"Run Up"	2021	Hamo Grime, Mauley G, Sleepy Hallow, Sheff G	Year of the H 3
"Brush Em"	2021	Pop Smoke	Faith
"Don't Know Em"	2021	Pop Smoke	Faith (Deluxe)
"Big WOOS"	2021	Dusty Locane	Untamed
"Shots"	2022	Jim Jones, Gwoppy, Jovohn	Gangsta Grillz: We Set The Trends
"No Location"	2022	Curly Savv, Dread Woo, Quelly Woo	Glocky Szn 2
"Game Over"	2022	Curly Savv	Glocky Szn 2
"Hockey Mask"	2022	C Choppa	Preface
"Dumping It Too"	2022	Lil Mabu	Double M's
"BG Xmas"	2022	Jim Jones, Dyce Payso, Antha Pantha	Jim Jones Presents: 12 Days of Xmas
"She Love Me"	2023	Ron Suno	Its My Time
"Hit or Miss"	2023	OnPointLikeOP	My Brother's Keeper
"No Pressure"	2023	Rowdy Rebel, Fetty Luciano, Fivio Foreign	Splash Brothers
"Sturdy" (Remix)	2023	Albee, Ron Suno, Tay Savage, MG Ant	I'm from Marion (Deluxe)
"Above the Rim"	2023	Moe	Moetivation
"Introducing Steelz"	2024	Steelz, G Perico, Allstar JR, Justin Credible	Steel My Turn
