= Sueco =

American musician (born 1997)

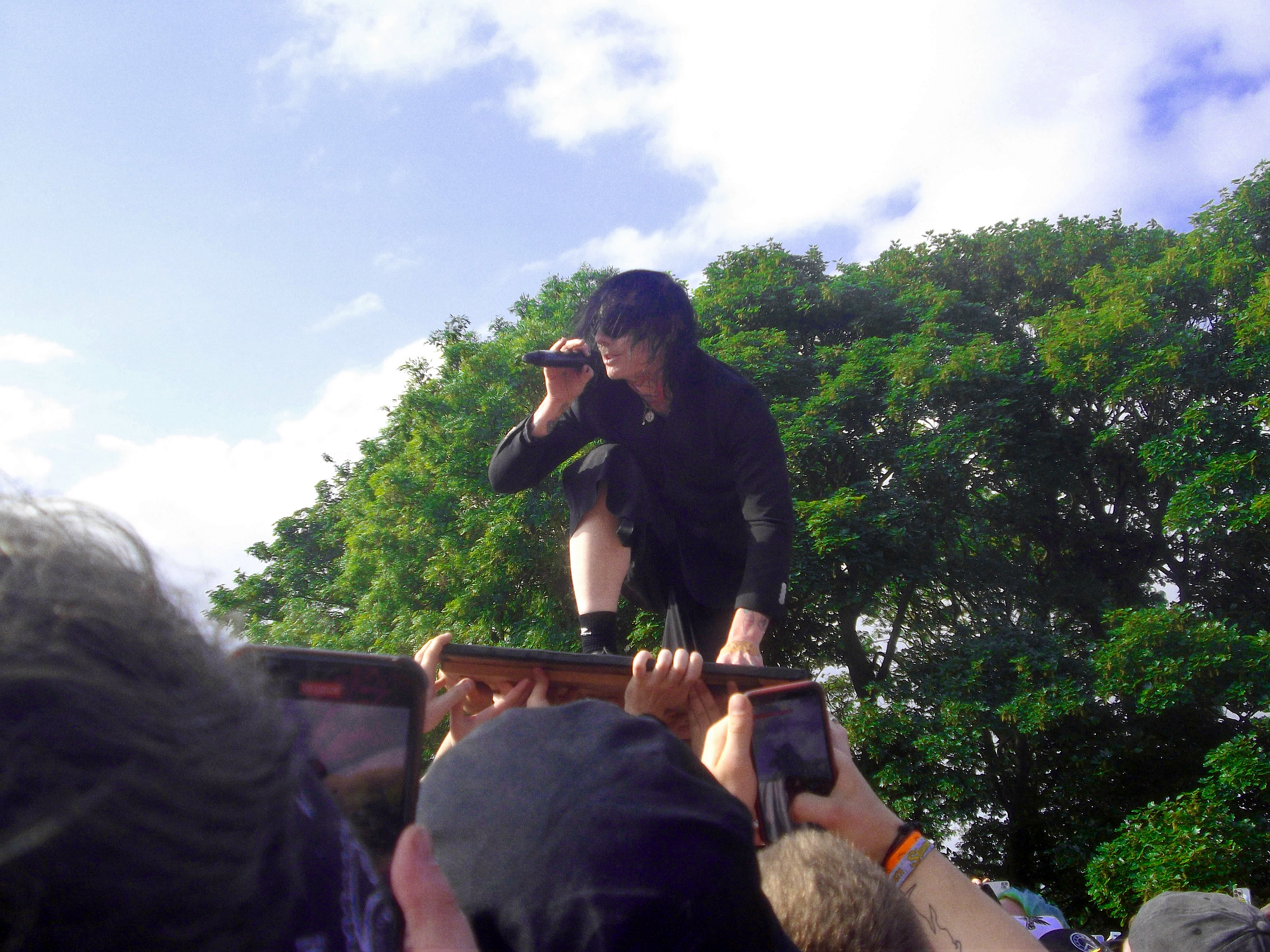
- Sueco performing in 2023

Background information
- Also known as: SuecoTheChild
- Born: William Henry Victor Schultz; January 28, 1997 (age 29)
- Origin: Los Angeles, California, U.S.
- Genres: Emo rap; pop-punk; alternative hip hop; metalcore
- Occupations: Rapper; singer; songwriter
- Years active: 2017–present
- Label: Atlantic
- Website: https://www.sueco.com/

William Henry Victor Schultz (born January 28, 1997), better known by the stage names Sueco or SuecoTheChild, is an American rapper and singer-songwriter from Los Angeles. He first became known for his 2019 single "Fast", which received platinum certification by the Recording Industry Association of America (RIAA) in July 2022 after going viral on TikTok. His 2021 song "Paralyzed" marked his first entry on both the Billboard Hot 100 and Global 200, also receiving gold certification by the RIAA.

He was signed by Atlantic Records after the success of "Fast", and the song later appeared on his major label debut extended play (EP), Miscreant (2019). In 2021, he guest appeared alongside Fever 333 on Papa Roach's single "Swerve". His debut studio album, It Was Fun While It Lasted (2022), was supported by the success of "Paralyzed", and explored a pop-punk sound. He independently released his second album, Attempted Lover (2024), to general praise from critics, who described it as more emotive and mature than its predecessor. His third album, Party’s Over, was released on October 9, 2026.

== Discography ==
=== Studio albums ===
List of studio albums, with selected details
Title	Studio album details
It Was Fun While It Lasted	Released: March 4, 2022; Label: Atlantic Records; Format: CD, LP, digital download, streaming
Attempted Lover	Released: July 19, 2024; Label: Suecotic Records; Format: LP, digital download, streaming
Party's Over	Released: October 9, 2026; Label: Suecotic Records; Format: LP, digital download, streaming

=== Extended plays ===
List of EPs, with selected details
Title	EP details
TrippyNights	Released: September 14, 2017; Label: Self-released; Format: Digital download, streaming
Miscreant	Released: September 20, 2019; Label: Atlantic Records; Format: Digital download, streaming

=== Singles ===
- "Tailwhip" (2018)
- "The View" (2018)
- "Henny In The Trunk" (2018)
- "Put On My Dogs" (2018)
- "Never Enough" (2018)
- "I Love Grape Soda" (2018)
- "Five Bands" (2018)
- "Bird Box" (2018)
- "Insane" (2019)
- "Fast" (2019)
- "Fishscale" (2019)
- "Speed Me Up" (with Wiz Khalifa, Ty Dolla Sign, & Lil Yachty) (2020)
- "Juice" (2020)
- "Primadona" (2020)
- "SOS" (featuring Travis Barker) (2021)
- "Paralyzed" (2021)
- "Sober / Hungover" (featuring Arizona Zervas) (2021)
- "Story of My Life" (featuring Illenium & Trippie Redd) (2021)
- "Loser" (2022)
- "Next Ex" (2022)
- "Robbery" (with DREAMERS) (2022)
- "Today" (2022)
- "Funeral" (2022)
- "Ride It Hard" (with Warren Zeiders) (2022)
- "POS" (2023)
- "Help Me" (2023)
- "Yours" (featuring Bea Miller) (2023)
- "Drama Queen" (2024)
- "Mulholland Drive" (2024)
- "Outta My Head" (2024)
- "Love and Rage" (2024)
- "Going Nowhere" (with RJ Pasin and WesGhost) (2026)
- "Rearranging Scars" (2026)
- "ENEMY" (with blackbear) (2026)
- "Are You Entertained?" (with Jeris Johnson) (2026)
- "Going Under" (with Paledusk) (2026)

• “Trust Myself” (with WesGhost) (2026)
