= West Coast (G-Eazy and Blueface song) =

2019 single by G-Eazy and Blueface

Single by G-Eazy and Blueface

from the album Beats
- Released: February 28, 2019
- Genre: West Coast hip hop
- Length: 2:19
- Label: RCA
- Songwriters: Gerald Gillum; Johnathan Porter; Benjamin Falik; Ali Malek; Richard Serrell
- Producer: Julia Lewis

G-Eazy singles chronology
"No Keys" (2019)	"West Coast" (2019)	"W.A.N.T.S" (2019)

Blueface singles chronology
"Thotiana (Remix)" (2019)	"West Coast" (2019)	"Birds" (2019)

Music video
- "West Coast" on YouTube

Remix cover
- Cover art of the official remix featuring Allblack and YG.

"West Coast" is a song by American rappers G-Eazy and Blueface, released on February 28, 2019, and produced by Julia Lewis. It contains a sample of "Let's Ride" by Richie Rich. An official remix of the song featuring American rappers Allblack and YG was released a month later.

The song appears on the soundtrack of the 2019 American film Beats.

== Composition ==
"West Coast" is a house-tinged song that uses a loop sampling the chorus of "Let's Ride". It is considered an ode to California. Performing in a laid-back flow, G-Eazy hints at releasing new music in the summer. He also brags in his verse that his last album (The Beautiful & Damned) provides for his grandchildren, he drives a black Ferrari, and has an endorsement with Puma. Blueface calls himself the "face of the West Coast" and centers on what he loves about California, specifically the women and marijuana, while also using his viral phrases.

== Critical reception ==
Trey Alston of MTV wrote of the song, "It barely runs above two minutes, but the pair's chemistry and obvious infatuation with their birthplace makes it a lively, and also slightly adorable, listen." Emmanuel Maduakolam of Hypebeast gave a positive review, commenting the song "captures the exciting new California energy and channels it into a perfect slapper. The Bay and L.A. connect for an excellent party record that should be played at high levels."

== Remix ==
An official remix of the song was released on March 28, 2019, and features verses from Allblack and YG. Allblack raps in a fast-paced flow (which has been compared to that of E-40) and compares himself to NBA player Spud Webb, while YG explains his connection to Blueface.

== Music video ==
The music video was filmed in February 2019 and directed by Daniel CZ. It is shot in black-and-white and features neon accents from animator Ofir Shoham. The video shows palm trees, hyphy dancing, Crip and Blood-walking, and luxury vehicles doing donuts in abandoned parking lots. G-Eazy and Blueface cruise up Fairfax Avenue of Los Angeles in the former's black Ferrari, while the latter flaunts a stack of cash and dances in the street alongside a bouncing lowrider driven by Ty Dolla Sign. The clip features cameos from local rappers E-40, Richie Rich, P-Lo, Yung Pinch, Kossisko, Haiti Babii, Guapdad 4000 and Danny Seth.

== Live performances ==
G-Eazy, Blueface and Allblack performed the song on Jimmy Kimmel Live! on April 29, 2019.

== Charts ==
Chart (2019)	Peak position
Canada Hot 100 (Billboard)	81
New Zealand Hot Singles (RMNZ)	15
US Bubbling Under Hot 100 (Billboard)	1
US Hot R&B/Hip-Hop Songs (Billboard)	37
US Rhythmic Airplay (Billboard)	20

== Certifications ==
Region	Certification	Certified units/sales
New Zealand (RMNZ)	Gold	15,000^{‡}
United States (RIAA)	Gold	500,000^{‡}
^{‡} Sales+streaming figures based on certification alone.
