= Dusty Locane =

American rapper (born 1999)

- Born: Reginald Miot; June 11, 1999 (age 27); Canarsie, Brooklyn, New York, U.S.
- Genres: Hip hop; Brooklyn drill
- Occupations: Rapper; songwriter
- Years active: 2019–present
- Children: 4

Reginald Miot (born June 11, 1999), better known by his stage name Dusty Locane, is an American rapper. He began gaining recognition in 2020 and 2021 when his singles "Rollin n Controllin Freestyle" and "Rolando (Caught in the Rain)" began getting popular on various social media platforms, most notably TikTok. He has been noted by Billboard for his "raspy, drill sound," and by Pitchfork, who called "Rolando (Caught in the Rain)" a "must-hear" rap song.

== Early and personal life ==
Reginald Miot was raised in "a good home," not "subjected to the harsh realities of living in the hood," in Canarsie, Brooklyn, New York. His father is Haitian and his mother is Trinidadian, which led to him listening to soca music as a child, in addition to hip hop and R&B. He attended college for a year before getting expelled and initially wanted to pursue a career in basketball. He then spent some time in jail, and started considering a music career seriously upon being released. He is affiliated with the Rollin' 60s Neighborhood Crips. The rapper has three children, a son born on March 23, 2022, a daughter born June 11, 2022, and another son born in August 2022.

== Career ==
As of August 2023 he has released two albums, two collaborative albums, one mixtape, two extended plays and 28 singles (including 13 as a featured artist).

Dusty Locane released his debut single, "Rollin n Controllin Freestyle", on August 7, 2020. On January 8, 2021, DJ Akademiks posted two videos of Locane rapping to his millions of followers on Instagram, thus introducing him to new listeners. By December 2021, the song had 200 million streams and was certified gold by the RIAA.

Dusty Locane announced that his debut album, Untamed, was to be released on November 19, 2021. The album was postponed, however, out of respect for rapper Young Dolph, who was murdered on November 17. It was finally released on December 3, 2021. The album contained 20 songs and was generally received rather positively by critics. The album was supported by 6 singles and featured guest appearances from OMB Jaydee, 3Kizzy, Yung Bleu, 8ANDITT, Rah Swish, Bxsic CSA, KNG MORE BREESH.

On September 2, 2022, Dusty Locane released a 7 track EP titled Rollin N Controllin. The EP featured the singles "Rollin n Controllin Freestyle", "Rolando (Caught in the Rain)", "Rollin n Controllin, Pt. 2 (Picture Me)" and "Rollin N Controllin, Pt.3 (Been Rollin)". The EP featured a sole appearance from Kajun Waters.

On September 23, 2022, Dusty Locane released a collaboration album alongside fellow rappers Ron Suno, Rah Swish and OnPointLikeOP titled Say Dat. The album contained 8 songs.

On October 31, 2022, Dusty Locane released an album titled Nightmare On Da Fifth. The album was supported by the single "Cremate (Run Outta Lucc)" which featured Stelly Hundo, OMB Jay Dee and 3Kizzy. The album featured 15 songs and guest appearances from 3Kizzy, Kajun Waters, SFIV5, TaTa, Stelly Hundo and OMB Jay Dee. 3 of the albums songs were released on previous Dusty Locane projects such as "PRESSURE" and "ROLANDO 2 (Catch The Rain)" both coming from Rollin N Controllin and "WAY BACC" coming from Say Dat.

On December 5, 2022, Dusty Locane released an EP titled Catch Da Flu. The EP featured 6 songs.

== Legal issues ==
In November 2022, Miot turned himself in to serve a sentence for gun charges (a minimum of one year with a maximum of three in prison) in connection to crimes committed from 2019 and 2020. He was released by February 15, 2024.

== Discography ==
=== Albums ===
List of albums, with selected details
Title	Details	Peak chart positions
Title	Details	US
Untamed	Released: December 3, 2021; Label: 95MM; Format: Digital download, streaming	123
Nightmare On Da Fifth	Released: October 31, 2022; Label: 95MM; Format: Digital download, streaming	—

=== Collaborative mixtapes ===
List of albums, with selected details
Title	Details	Peak chart positions
Title	Details	US
Say Dat (with Rah Swish, Ron Suno and OnPointLikeOP)	Released: September 23, 2022; Label: SAY DAT, Empire; Format: Digital download, streaming	—
-95 Degrees (with Kajun Waters)	Released: January 5, 2023; Label: 95MM, Empire; Format: Digital download, streaming	—

=== Mixtapes ===
Title	Album details
From Da Flu With Luv	Released: February 5, 2023; Label: 95MM; Formats: Digital download, streaming

=== EPs ===
Title	Album details
Rollin N Controllin	Released: September 2, 2022; Label: 95MM; Formats: Digital download, streaming
Catch Da Flu	Released: December 5, 2022; Label: 95MM; Formats: Digital download, streaming

=== Singles ===
==== As lead artist ====
List of singles, with selected details
Title	Year	Peak chart positions	Certifications	Album
Title	Year	CAN	Certifications	Album
"Rollin n Controllin Freestyle"	2020	80	RIAA: Gold	Untamed and Rollin N Controllin
"Rolando (Caught in the Rain)"	2020	—	RIAA: Gold	Untamed and Rollin N Controllin
"Intro 2 Me, Pt 1"	2021	—		Non-album single
"Rumble"	2021	—		Untamed
"Move Doley" (featuring OnPointLikeOp)	2021	—		Non-album single
"Rollin n Controllin, Pt. 2 (Picture Me)"	2021	—		Untamed and Rollin N Controllin
"Best Friend" (featuring 8anditt)	2021	—		Untamed
"Canes World"	2021	—		Untamed
"Cremate (Run Outta Lucc)" (featuring Stelly Hundo, OMB Jay Dee and 3Kizzy)	2022	—		Nightmare On Da Fifth
"Trenches" (featuring Ditta)	2022	—		Non-album single
"Rollin N Contollin, Pt.3 (Been Rollin)"	2022	—		Rollin N Controllin
"Demise" (featuring 3Kizzy)	2022	—		Non-album singles
"Slide" (featuring 3Kizzy)	2022	—		Non-album singles
"Stay Dangerous" (with OnPointLikeOP)	2023	—		My Brother's Keeper
"Mr Smith (Top Shoota)" (featuring Great John )	2023	—		Non-album single
"Beast Out The Cage"	2024	—		TBA
"Darc Room"	2024	—		TBA

==== As featured artist ====
List of singles as featured artist, with selected chart positions, showing year released and album name
Title	Year	Peak chart positions	Album
Title	Year	CAN	Album
"Grabba (Remix)" (Ron Suno featuring Dusty Locane)	2021	—	Suno Mode
"Try It (Remix)" (Azjah featuring Dusty Locane)	2021	—	Non-album singles
"Pop Out" (Lil Skrap1090 featuring Dusty Locane and G Herbo)	2021	—	Non-album singles
"Beautiful Girl (Remix)" (Nhale featuring Dusty Locane)	2022	—	Non-album singles
"Ratchets" (KitschKrieg featuring Dusty Locane and SFR)	2022	—	Non-album singles
"Stickup" (Jim Jones and DJ Drama featuring Dusty Locane and OnPointLikeOp)	2022	—	Gangsta Grillz: We Set The Trends and My Brother's Keeper
"Shoes" (Ron Suno featuring Dusty Locane and Rah Swish)	2022	—	Suno Mode
"Seeing Red" (7evil7ins featuring Dusty Locane and Rah Swish)	2022	—	Non-album singles
"Yung, Rich and Famous" (Zion Foster featuring Dusty Locane)	2022	—	Non-album singles
"Chevelle (Remix)" (Kajun Waters featuring Dusty Locane)	2022	—	-95 Degrees
"Burpees" (ALLBLACK featuring Dusty Locane)	2022	—	Born To Score
"Free Cane" (SFIV5 featuring Dusty Locane)	2023	—	Non-album singles
"Birthday" (Fergie Baby featuring Kajun Water and Dusty Locane)	2023	—	Non-album singles
"Nothing To Fuc Wit" (Pacman da Gunman featuring Dusty Locane)	2023	—	Non-album singles

=== Guest appearances ===
List of non-single guest appearances, with other performing artists, showing year released and album name
Title	Year	Other artists	Album
"Ready 2 Die"	2021	Tayy Floss	Gift Wrap
"Step Out."	2022	Kwengface	YPB: The Archive
"Name Drop"	2022	Don Q	Corleone
"No Snitching"	2022	Lil Mabu	Double M'S
"King Of The World" (Remix)	2022	Lil Mabu	Double M'S
"Put In Work"	2022	Badda TD, DJ Drama	The World Is Yours: Gangsta Grillz
"Before I Let You Go"	2022	Vedo, OG Parker	While You Wait
"Nightmare"	2022	OMB Jay Dee	Are You Dumb Vol.1
"Young, Rich and Famous"	2023	Zion Foster	Hood Love (Extended)
"Rich Porter"	2023	Jimbo World	Him
