= Famous Cryp =

Mixtape by Blueface
- Released: June 20, 2018
- Recorded: 2018–2020
- Genre: West Coast hip hop
- Length: 21:08
- Label: 5th Amendment; eOne
- Producer: Scum Beatz; FBeats; LowTheGreat; Laudiano; Sammy P Beats

Blueface chronology
Famous Cryp (2018)	Two Coccy (2018)

Singles from Famous Cryp
- 1. "Thotiana" Released: February 2, 2018; 2. "Respect My Cryppin'" Released: May 26, 2018; 3. "Hocus Pocus" Released: October 31, 2019; 4. "Tour" Released: April 17, 2020; 5. "Pinocchio (Remix)" Released: May 1, 2020; 6. "First Mission" Released: June 19, 2020; 7. "Finesse the Beat" Released: June 26, 2020; 8. "Traphouse" Released: July 3, 2020; 9. "Yea Yea" Released: July 10, 2020

Famous Cryp is the debut mixtape by American rapper Blueface. It was released on June 20, 2018 by Fifth Amendment Entertainment and Entertainment One. The mixtape features a guest appearance by fellow West Coast rapper Joey Franko. The mixtape was re-released as a reloaded edition on July 24, 2020. It features additional guest appearances from Trucarr, Snoop Dogg, Cardi B, Asian Doll, 9lokkNine, NLE Choppa, YG, Ron Suno, Coyote, Sada Baby, Kiddo Curry, Flash Gottii, 03 Greedo, DJ Kay Slay, A Boogie wit da Hoodie, and Moneybagg Yo. It contains production from Laudiano, Scum Beatz, and LowTheGreat, among a variety of other record producers.

The mixtape's lead single, "Thotiana", peaked at number 8 on the Billboard Hot 100 chart and has an official remix featuring Cardi B and YG on the reloaded edition, with two separate remixes with each artist individually featured.

== Critical reception ==
Professional ratings
Review scores
Source	Rating
AllMusic	3.5/5 stars

Fred Thomas of AllMusic described the album as offering "a brief snapshot of his style, characterized by a flow that seems entirely unconcerned with following the beat", adding that Blueface's vocal style "gasps, sputters, and stumbles as it rolls out weird but charismatic one-liners and hooks."

== Track listing ==
Famous Cryp track listing
No.	Title	Writer(s)	Producer(s)	Length
1.	"Dead Locs"	Johnathan Porter; John Nathaniel	Scum Beatz	2:13
2.	"Dead Locs, Pt. 2"	Porter; Nathaniel	Scum Beatz	2:05
3.	"Thotiana"	Porter; Nathaniel	Scum Beatz	2:09
4.	"Freak Bitch"	Porter; Nathaniel	Scum Beatz	1:45
5.	"Fucced Em"	Porter; Felipe Huerta	FBeats	1:44
6.	"Famous Cryp"	Porter	LowTheGreat	2:10
7.	"Respect My Cryppin'"	Porter; Hamish Muir	Laudiano	2:21
8.	"Uncle Phillip"	Porter	Sammy P Beats	1:45
9.	"Put In Her Face"	Porter; Huerta	FBeats	2:14
10.	"Show Up" (featuring Joey Franko)	Porter; Joey Franko	OniiMadeThis	2:37
Total length:				21:08

Reloaded edition (bonus tracks)
No.	Title	Writer(s)	Producer(s)	Length
11.	"Outside" (featuring TruCarr)	Porter; Darren Carr; Earl Johnson; Cash Jones	Rumbles	3:12
12.	"First Mission"	Porter; Nathaniel	Scum Beatz; Verrsaucy	2:23
13.	"Respect My Cryppin' (Remix)" (featuring Snoop Dogg)	Porter; Calvin Broadus, Jr.; Muir	Laudiano	3:12
14.	"Thotiana (Remix)" (featuring Cardi B and YG)	Porter; Belcalis Almánzar; Keenon Jackson; Nathaniel	Scum Beatz	4:57
15.	"Finesse the Beat"	Porter; Nathaniel	Scum Beatz	2:31
16.	"Only Fans"	Porter; Nathaniel	Scum Beatz	2:20
17.	"Pinocchio (Remix)" (featuring Ron Suno)	Porter; Keron Foriest	Hargo	3:06
18.	"Yea Yea" (with Coyote)	Porter; Joseph Gonzales; Nathaniel	Scum Beatz	2:51
19.	"Tour" (featuring Asian Doll, Glokk 9, NLE Choppa, Sada Baby, and Kiddo Curry)	Porter; Misharron Allen; Jacquavius Smith; Bryson Potts; Casada Sorrell; Kiddo Curry; Michael Crook	Mike Crook	4:27
20.	"Traphouse" (with Flash Gottii featuring 03 Greedo)	Porter; Daniel-Flamma Sherman; Jason Jackson	Mustard; GYLTTRYP	2:37
21.	"Hocus Pocus" (with DJ Kay Slay featuring A Boogie wit da Hoodie and Moneybagg Yo)	Porter; Keith Grayson; Artist Dubose; Demario White, Jr.	DJ Kay Slay	2:33
22.	"Baby"	Porter; Nathaniel; Crook	Scum Beats; Mike Crook	2:13
Total length:				55:30

== Charts ==
=== Weekly charts ===
Chart (2018–19)	Peak position
US Billboard 200	29
US Top R&B/Hip-Hop Albums (Billboard)	17

=== Year-end charts ===
Chart (2019)	Position
US Top R&B/Hip-Hop Albums (Billboard)	85
