= Holy Moly (song) =

2020 single by Blueface featuring NLE Choppa

Single by Blueface featuring NLE Choppa

from the album Find the Beat
- Released: March 6, 2020
- Genre: Trap
- Length: 1:57
- Label: Cash Money; Republic
- Songwriters: Johnathan Porter; Bryson Potts; Earl Johnson
- Producer: Scum Beatz

Blueface singles chronology
"Obama" (2020)	"Holy Moly" (2020)	"Tour" (2020)

NLE Choppa singles chronology
"100 Shots" (2020)	"Holy Moly" (2020)	"Grim Reapa Flow" (2020)

Music video
- "Holy Moly" on YouTube

"Holy Moly" is a song by American rapper Blueface featuring fellow American rapper NLE Choppa. Written alongside producer Scum Beatz, it was released on March 6, 2020 as the fourth single from the former's debut studio album Find the Beat.

== Background and composition ==
The cover art and title of the song is a reference to the Holy Moly Donut Shop, which is featured in the 2002 film Friday After Next; the song also begins with a sample from the film. The hook has lyrics about a .40 leaving someone "like a donut".

== Music video ==
The music video was released alongside the song. Directed by Aaron Green of California Creatives, it shows the rappers running a donut shop, baking the donuts and sprinkling them with marijuana in the same manner as Turkish butcher and chef Salt Bae. Blueface is also seen waving a gun. He and NLE Choppa party and dance with a crowd of customers outside and inside the shop. The clip ends with a skit in which the rappers steal money from customers.

== Charts ==
Chart performance for "Holy Moly"
Chart (2020)	Peak position
New Zealand Hot Singles (RMNZ)	32
