= MO3 (rapper) =

American rapper (1992–2020)

- MO3 in 2017

Background information
- Born: Melvin Abdul Noble Jr. May 31, 1992; McKinney, Texas, U.S
- Died: November 11, 2020 (aged 28) Dallas, Texas, U.S.
- Cause of death: Murder (gunshot wounds)
- Genre: Southern hip-hop
- Occupations: Rapper; songwriter
- Years active: 2013–2020
- Labels: H$M; Empire; Badazz

Melvin Abdul Noble Jr. (May 31, 1992 – November 11, 2020), known professionally as MO3, was an American rapper from Dallas, Texas, known for his 2020 single "Broken Love" (remixed featuring Kevin Gates), which received double platinum certification by the Recording Industry Association of America (RIAA).

His collaborative album with Boosie Badazz, BadAzz Mo3, moderately entered the U.S. Billboard 200. His posthumous album, Shottaz 4Eva (2021) reached number 36 on the chart. He guest appeared on the remix of OG Bobby Billions’ 2021 single "Outside", which peaked at number 92 on the Billboard Hot 100.

On November 11, 2020, MO3 was shot and killed in Dallas. Fellow Dallas rapper Yella Beezy was found guilty of ordering his murder on November 11, 2026.

== Early life and career ==
MO3 was born in McKinney, Texas. He later moved to North Dallas, where he was raised.

His debut mixtape, Shottaz, was released in 2014. The same year, MO3 released his single "Hold Ya Tongue", a remix of Texas rapper Mr. Lucci, which resulted in him gaining buzz throughout the region.

In 2016, MO3 released Shottaz Reloaded, a project with numerous hits that gained the attention of Boosie Badazz, who at the time wanted to sign him.

== Personal life ==
Noble was the father of three children, two girls and one boy.

== Death ==
Noble was shot and killed on November 11, 2020, at the age of 28. While driving on Interstate 35 in Dallas, Noble was pursued by another vehicle, leading him to stop his car in the center lane of the highway. The shooter stopped his car and approached Noble’s vehicle.

Noble tried to retrieve a weapon but was unsuccessful and attempted to escape on foot. White chased Noble and shot him multiple times with a rifle before fleeing in his dark colored vehicle, believed to be a 2015 Chevrolet Camaro. Noble was transported to a local hospital where he was pronounced dead.

Two suspects were arrested for his murder: the gunman Kewon Dontrell White on December 9, 2020, and Devin Maurice Brown on April 23, 2021.

On March 20, 2025, Markies Conway (also known as Yella Beezy) was arrested by Dallas County Texas in connection with felony capital murder-for-hire charges of MO3 in the State of Texas vs. Conway, Markies (Case #F-25-00154). The charges allege that Conway hired White to carry out the murder of Noble.

In August 2023, Noble's estate filed a lawsuit against Ray Gene Bollin, Jr., an audio technician and owner of Absolut Production Recording Studios, over claims made by Bollin that he was entitled to an ownership stake in seventy-eight previously released recordings and fifty-one unreleased recordings. Bollin also claimed that he was owed money for use of the studio. In May 2025, a federal jury in Sherman, Texas, ruled in favor of MO3’s estate, finding that Noble has sole ownership over the recordings.

On September 4, 2026, a Dallas County jury found Kewon White, who was alleged to have been hired by Conway to carry out the murder of Noble, guilty of capital murder. Immediately following his conviction, White was sentenced to life in prison without parole.

On November 11, 2026 Conway was found guilty of Noble's murder and sentenced to life in prison without the possibility of parole.

In addition to White and Conway, a third defendant was also charged with capital murder over Noble's murder, Devin Brown.

== Discography ==
=== Studio albums ===
Title	Album details	Peak chart positions			
Title	Album details	US	US R&B/HH	US Rap	US Ind.
Badazz MO3 (with Boosie Badazz)	Released: February 14, 2020; Label: Badazz H$M, Empire; Format: Digital download, streaming	136	—	—	16
Shottaz 4Eva	Released: April 9, 2021; Label: H$M, Empire; Format: Digital download, streaming	36	18	15	4

=== Mixtapes ===
Title	Mixtape details	Peak chart positions		
Title	Mixtape details	US R&B/HH	US Ind.	US Heat.
Shottaz	Released: September 3, 2014; Label: H$M; Format: Digital download, streaming	—	—	—
Shottaz Reloaded	Released: April 5, 2016; Label: H$M; Format: Digital download, streaming	23	22	2
4 Indictments	Released: October 31, 2016; Label: H$M; Format: Digital download, streaming	26	13	1
Gangsta Love, Part 1	Released: February 21, 2017; Label: H$M; Format: Digital download, streaming	—	14	2
Shottaz 3.0	Released: March 15, 2018; Label: H$M; Format: Digital download, streaming	—	30	9
911: Gangsta Grillz	Released: December 17, 2018; Label: The Dispensary; Format: Digital download, streaming	—	—	—
Osama	Released: December 13, 2019; Label: H$M, Empire; Format: Digital download, streaming	—	31	6

=== Charted and certified singles ===
Title	Year	Peak chart positions			Certifications	Album
Title	Year	US	US R&B/HH	US Rap	Certifications	Album
"Errybody Not Your Friend"	2018	—	—	—	RIAA: Gold	Shottaz 3.0
"Broken Love" (solo or with Kevin Gates)	2020	—	—	—	RIAA: 2× Platinum	Shottaz 4Eva
"Outside" (Remix) (with OG Bobby Billions)	2021	92	32	24	RIAA: 2× Platinum	Shottaz 4Eva

== Record labels ==
- Hit Sqwadd Muzik
- Empire Distribution
- Boosie Badazz's Bad Azz
- Create Music Group

== See also ==
- List of American singers
- List of murdered hip hop musicians
- List of people from Dallas
