= Rollin n Controllin Freestyle =

2020 single by Dusty Locane

Single by Dusty Locane

from the album Untamed
- Released: August 7, 2020
- Recorded: June 2020
- Genre: Brooklyn drill
- Length: 3:11
- Label: 95MM; Empire
- Songwriter: Reginald Miot
- Producer: CP Beats

Dusty Locane singles chronology
"Rollin n Controllin Freestyle" (2020)	"Rolando (Caught in the Rain)" (2020)

Music video
- "Rollin n Controllin Freestyle" on YouTube

"Rollin n Controllin Freestyle" (stylized in all caps) is the debut single by American rapper Dusty Locane, released on August 7, 2020. The song led to him gaining recognition in late 2020 and early 2021, due to comparisons drawn between Locane and the late rapper Pop Smoke. The song is also the lead single from Dusty Locane's debut studio album Untamed (2021). The song also acted as the lead single for his debut extended play Rollin N Controllin (2022).

== Background ==
The song originated from a freestyle rap which Dusty Locane performed over a beat produced by CP Beats that was originally meant for one of his friends. Following his release from jail in June 2020, Locane first recorded his verse on his phone, and then recorded the song in a makeshift studio. In the song, he raps about his lifestyle and "how far he'll go to protect his name and his team."

The song began gaining over a million views on YouTube upon its release. On January 8, 2021, YouTuber DJ Akademiks posted on Instagram a clip of the song's music video, as well as a clip of Locane's song "Rolando (Caught in the Rain)", bringing them more attention. "Rollin n Controllin Freestyle" subsequently amassed 30 million streams on Spotify and 14 million views on YouTube. As it became popular, many listeners compared Dusty Locane to Pop Smoke, noting their remarkably similar sounds and voices.

A sequel to the song, "Rollin n Controllin, Pt. 2 (Picture Me)", was released on May 14, 2021.

== Charts ==
Chart (2021)	Peak position
Canada (Canadian Hot 100)	80

== Certifications ==
Region	Certification	Certified units/sales
United States (RIAA)	Gold	500,000^{‡}
^{‡} Sales+streaming figures based on certification alone.
