= Blueface =

American rapper (born 1997)

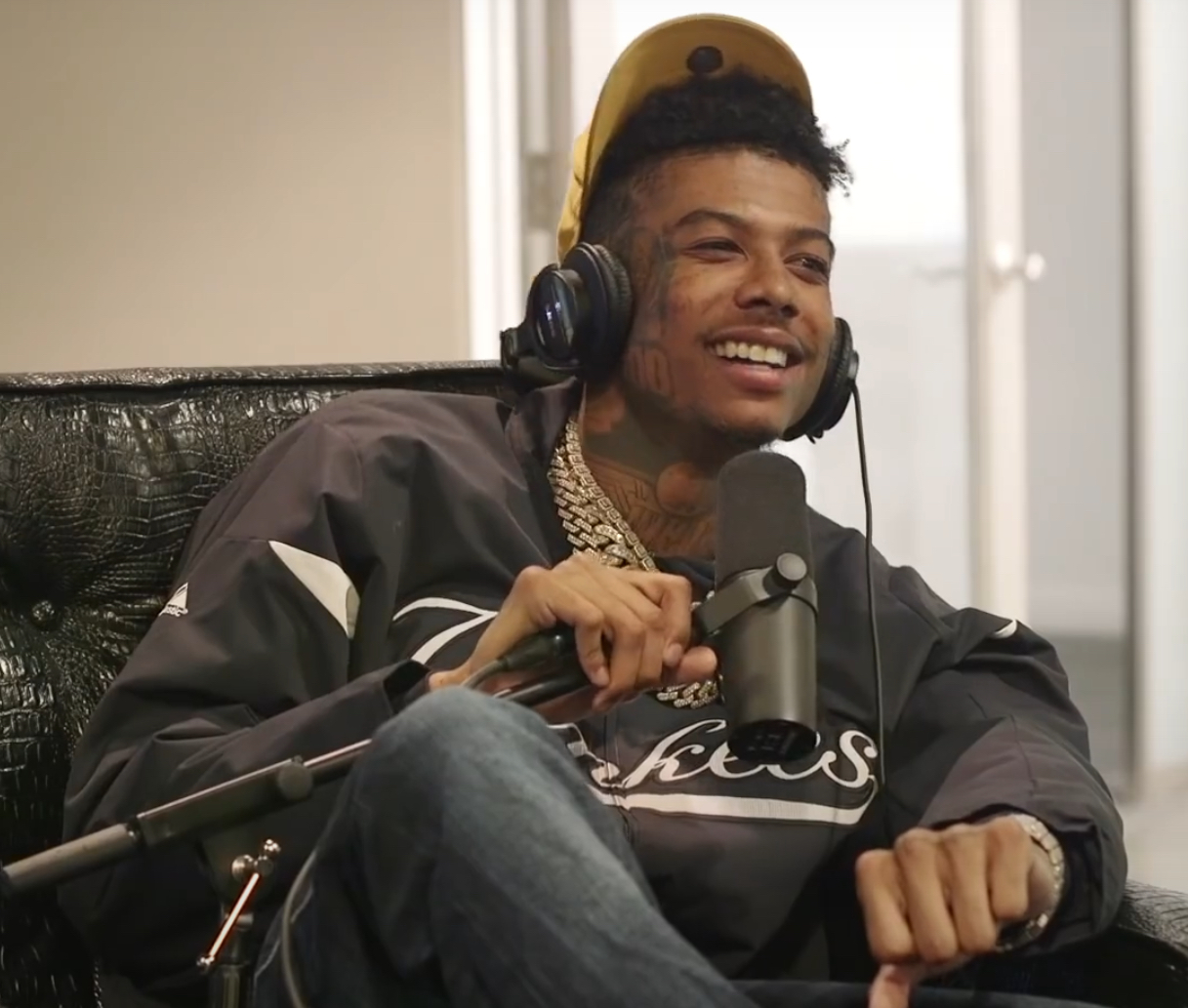
- Blueface in 2020

Background information
- Also known as: Blueface Bleedem
- Born: Johnathan Michael Porter; January 20, 1997 (age 29); Los Angeles, California, U.S.
- Genres: West Coast hip-hop; trap
- Occupations: Rapper; boxer
- Years active: 2017–present
- Labels: 100 Ent; Cash Money (former); Republic (former); Fifth Amendment; E1
- Partner: Chrisean Rock (2020–2023)
- Children: 4
- Website: blueface.shop.capthat.com

Johnathan Michael Porter (born January 20, 1997), known professionally as Blueface, is an American rapper and professional boxer. In October 2018, after releasing the music video for his song "Respect My Cryppin'", he became a viral meme due to his offbeat style of rapping. The following month, he signed with Cash Money West, the California branch of Birdman's Cash Money Records label.

His 2018 single, "Thotiana", became a "sleeper hit" the following year, peaking at number eight on the Billboard Hot 100 and spawning two remixes: one with Cardi B and another with YG. His debut studio album, Find the Beat (2020), sustained long-term delays, and was met with lukewarm critical and commercial reception.

== Early life ==
Johnathan Michael Porter was born on January 20, 1997, in Los Angeles, California. He grew up in Mid-City in central Los Angeles and attended multiple elementary schools. He initially lived with his mother in Santa Clarita Valley, and some years later settled in Oakland with his father.

After relocating to the San Fernando Valley, Porter attended Arleta High School, where he joined the marching band and played the alto saxophone, in addition to playing on the school football team. After a growth spurt during his sophomore year which resulted in him standing at 6 ft 4 in (1.93 m), he became the team's starting quarterback. He threw for 1,234 yards and 17 touchdowns in 2013 and improved those numbers to 1,724 yards and 21 touchdowns in 2014, leading the team to an East Valley League championship. Porter committed to play for Fayetteville State University and briefly played college football before leaving in 2016. Porter references his past experiences as a football player in the video for the remix to "Thotiana", where the rapper portrays a highly recruited high school quarterback disrespecting his coach due to his desire to pursue women and fame rather than football.

== Music career ==
=== 2017–2018: Viral success, Famous Cryp, and "Bleed It" ===
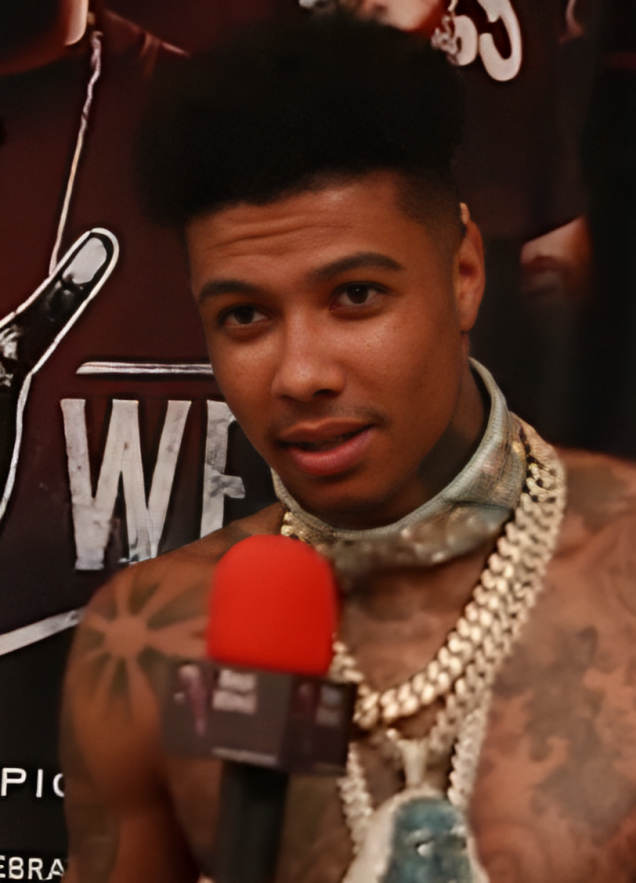
Blueface in 2019

Blueface began rapping in January 2017 under the name Blueface Bleedem, a reference to his ties to the School Yard Crips street gang. Originally moving back to Los Angeles after leaving Fayetteville State University, he was invited to his friend Laudiano's music studio to retrieve a phone charger, and after being challenged to rap over a beat, Blueface began to work to release his first song, "Deadlocs", produced by Laudiano, onto SoundCloud. In June 2018, he released his first full-length project, Famous Cryp. In September 2018, after the song and EP helped him build a local following in California, he released his second EP, Two Coccy, onto SoundCloud and Spotify.

In October 2018, Blueface released a music video for his song, "Respect My Cryppin'", on WorldStarHipHop's YouTube channel. Shortly after the song was posted to Twitter, where it became a viral meme. The video's popularity led to more of Blueface's music receiving attention, with his songs "Thotiana" and "Next Big Thing" earning newfound popularity. His popularity increased even further after holding a contest on his Instagram stories and posts using polls to determine which high school he should visit, with Pasadena High School edging out a victory over Santa Monica High School. The social media challenge brought in new followers, increasing his already growing popularity. In November 2018, Blueface was signed to Cash Money Records' California affiliate Cash Money West, and posted clips of himself in the studio with Canadian rapper Drake and Quavo on his Instagram page.

In December 2018, Blueface again went viral thanks to an acoustic video with Einer Bankz previewing his new song, "Bleed It", which released officially in January 2019. He released the song two days later, including a video on the Lyrical Lemonade YouTube channel, directed by Cole Bennett, that amassed over 2 million views in the first 24 hours of its release.

=== 2019–present: "Thotiana", Dirt Bag, and Find the Beat ===
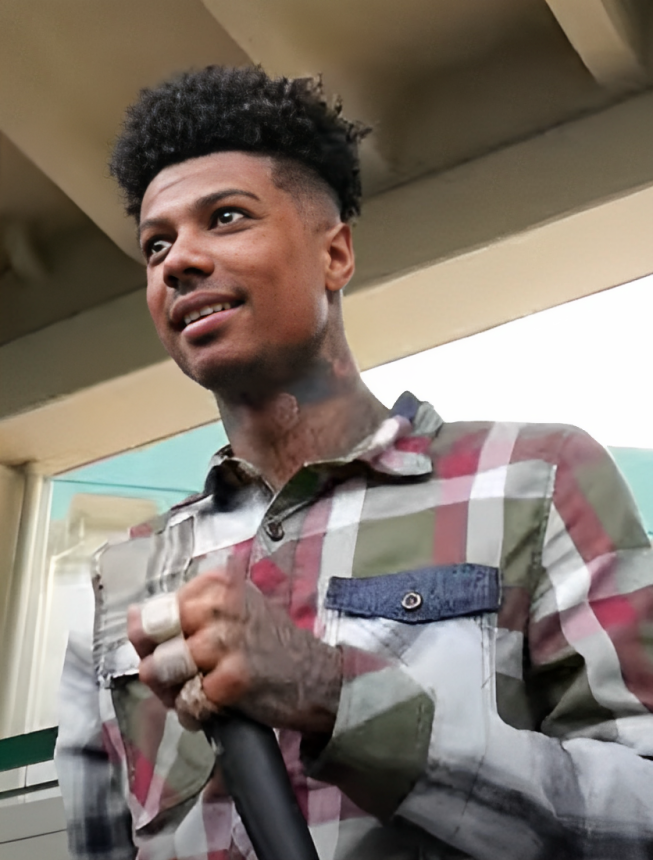
Blueface performing in 2020

On January 26, 2019, Blueface's song "Thotiana" debuted on the Billboard Hot 100 at number 75, making it his first track to chart on a Billboard chart. The song was released as a remix with YG with a music video. The following week, he released a remix with Cardi B, coinciding with another video from Cole Bennett. On streaming services, the two remixes are separate, but there is also a third where all three versions are put together. On May 1, 2019, Blueface released the music video for his single, "Stop Cappin", which has amassed over 5 million views over its first four days on YouTube. On June 20, Blueface was announced to be part of XXL's 2019 Freshman Class as the fan-voted eleventh entrant.

In August 2019, Blueface released an EP titled Dirt Bag; the album was preceded by the singles "Stop Cappin'", "Daddy" and "Bussdown". At eight tracks, the EP featured guest appearances from The Game, Rich the Kid, Offset, Lil Pump, and Mozzy. His song "Daddy" featuring Rich the Kid on the EP peaked at No. 78 on the Billboard Hot 100, and "Stop Cappin'" with The Game reached No. 15 on the Bubbling Under Hot 100. The EP peaked at No. 48 on the Billboard 200. Despite its commercial success, the EP received generally mixed critical reviews. Riley Wallace at Hip-Hop DX rated the project at 3/5, while listeners rated it at 2.33/5. Album of the Year appraised a total critic score of 60/100, while listeners reviewed it at 51/100. Fred Thomas of AllMusic followed the trend of middle-ranged reviews, giving the project a 3/5.

In October 2019, Blueface announced his debut studio album, Find the Beat, and its tracklist. He released four singles from the album, "Close Up" featuring Jeremih, "First Class" featuring Gunna, "Obama" featuring DaBaby, and "Holy Moly" featuring NLE Choppa. On December 6, 2019, the album was set to release but was delayed due to trademark issues. On January 17, 2020, the second release date was confirmed, but it was delayed again. On March 13, 2020, the third release date, the album released, with features from Polo G, Ambjaay, Lil Baby, Stunna 4 Vegas, YBN Nahmir, Gunna, Jeremih, NLE Choppa, and DaBaby, totaling 16 songs. Fellow rapper Lil Uzi Vert, who released Lil Uzi Vert vs. the World 2 the same day as Find the Beat, praised the album. In a private exchange with Blueface, Lil Uzi Vert said "album fye [sic]" and offered to collaborate with Blueface.

In 2021, Blueface opened a soul food restaurant in Santa Clarita, California, named Blue's Fish and Soul. However the restaurant did close in 2022, due to issues with the establishment. Blueface has since opened a new restaurant named King of Crabs in the Santa Clarita area.

== Musical style ==
Blueface's off-beat style of rapping and unique voice has been compared to fellow California rappers E-40 and Suga Free, as well as rapper Silkk the Shocker. Blueface has said that he writes "to the beat", and uses the instrumental as a base for all of his songs.

== Boxing career ==
In June 2021, Blueface announced he had signed to fight for the Bare Knuckle Fighting Championship. He made his debut in a special gloved match against TikToker Kane Trujillo on July 23, 2021, at BKFC 19. Blueface defeated Trujillo via unanimous decision after three rounds.

Blueface was originally set to have two bouts in 2022. The first bout was supposed to be a MF-professional bout against FaZe Temperrr as the co-feature on MF & DAZN: X Series 001 on August 27 in London, but was cancelled after an altercation he had with his girlfriend prior to the bout was made public. The second bout was supposed to be an exhibition bout against Swaggy P as the co-feature bout to Austin McBroom vs. AnEsonGib on September 10 in Los Angeles, California, but was cancelled after Blueface was denied his license.

In April 2023, Blueface fought English TikToker Ed Matthews as a "wildcard bout" on the High Stakes Tournament Quarter-Finals undercard at Wembley Arena in London, England. Blueface defeated Matthews via technical knockout in the fifth round.

In March 2026, Blueface returned to the ring after a three year hiatus to fight internet personality Chibu in an exhibition bout as the headliner for Adin Ross' BrandRisk 13. The bout took place at the BrandRisk Warehouse in Miami, Florida, with Chibu winning by unanimous decision after 6 rounds.After the fight, the promoter, Adin Ross, publicly claimed that Blueface breached his contract and announced that Blueface is being fined $100,000 and will not be paid for his fight.

== Legal issues ==
In 2018, Porter shot at a man who tried to rob him at a gas station in Newhall, California. Porter later was arrested and charged with shooting at an occupied vehicle, a felony in the state of California. Porter was released on $69,000 bail on November 18.

Porter was arrested in February 2019 for felony gun possession after law enforcement recovered a loaded, unregistered handgun in his possession.

On November 15, 2022, Porter was arrested on charges of attempted murder and shooting in Las Vegas, Nevada, on October 8 of that year. He was imprisoned in the Clark County Detention Center. On October 2, 2023, he was sentenced to three years probation, with a possible two-to-five year prison sentence if he violates probation. On January 12, 2024, Porter was arrested for violating his probation. In August 2024, Porter was sentenced to four years in prison, stemming from a battery incident in 2021 and probation violation. On November 3, 2025, Porter was released from prison after a two-year sentence.

On October 19, 2026, in Santa Clarita, California, Porter was detained on misdemeanor obstruction charges.

== Personal life ==
Porter has four children.

He dated Chrisean Malone (Chrisean Rock) from 2020 to 2023. In January 2023, Malone announced she was pregnant with Porter's child.

In January 2026, Porter drew media attention following a livestream appearance with rapper Stunna Girl. The broadcast led to speculation regarding his romantic status with internet personality Nevaeh Akira. Shortly afterward, Porter posted on X (formerly Twitter) that Akira had been "cut from the roster", a phrase he has used to describe his romantic partners. Akira responded publicly, stating that she had removed herself from the situation and asked for her name to be detached from Porter's personal life. Porter has since announced on social media that he is not the biological father of Chrisean Jesus Malone Jr.

On February 24, 2026, Porter announced that his girlfriend Nevaeh Akira is pregnant with their first child together, his fourth child on the way. Akira gave birth to a son on August 18, making this Blueface's fourth child.

== Controversy ==
In December 2019, Porter garnered backlash after he posted a video of himself standing on top of a black SUV and throwing cash into a crowd of people in Skid Row, a notoriously poverty-stricken area of Los Angeles. Although some saw it as a good gesture, his actions were also criticized as "dehumanizing".

On February 13, 2026, a video posted of Porter showed him choking a wax figure of American actress Zendaya, for which he faced criticism.

In September 2026, during a livestream, Porter claimed that as a nine-year-old he put peanut butter on his penis and let his Chihuahua lick it off. Women in a hot tub with him at the time appeared visibly uncomfortable.

== Discography ==
=== Studio albums ===
Title	Details	Peak chart positions		
Title	Details	US	US R&B/HH	CAN
Find the Beat	Released: March 13, 2020; Label: Cash Money, Republic; Format: Digital download, streaming	64	39	65

=== Mixtapes ===
Title	Details	Peak chart positions			
Title	Details	US	US R&B/HH	US Rap	CAN
Famous Cryp	Released: June 20, 2018; Label: 5th Amendment, eOne; Format: Digital download, streaming	29	17	17	25
We Over Famous (with Trendd)	Released: September 11, 2018; Label: Killeen Corp; Format: Digital download, streaming	—	—	—	—

=== Extended plays ===
Title	Details	Peak chart positions		
Title	Details	US	US R&B/HH	CAN
Two Coccy	Released: September 20, 2018; Label: Cash Money, Republic; Format: Digital download, streaming	—	—	—
Dirt Bag	Released: August 9, 2019; Label: Cash Money, Republic; Format: Digital download, streaming	48	29	41
Free Blueface	Released: January 12, 2024; Label: 100 Entertainment; Format: Digital download, streaming	—	—	—
"—" denotes a recording that did not chart or was not released in that territory.

=== Singles ===
==== As lead artist ====
Title	Year	Peak chart positions								Certifications	Album
Title	Year	US	US R&B/HH	US Main. R&B/HH	CAN	FRA	NZ	SWE	UK	Certifications	Album
"Fuck It Up" (with Trendd)	2017	—	—	—	—	—	—	—	—		Non-album single
"Thotiana" (solo or featuring YG or/and Cardi B)	2018	8	4	6	12	168	9	59	15	RIAA: Platinum; RMNZ: Gold	Famous Cryp
"Next Big Thing"	2018	—	—	—	—	—	—	—	—		Two Coccy
"Movie Scenes"	2018	—	—	—	—	—	—	—	—		Two Coccy
"DM"	2018	—	—	—	—	—	—	—	—		Non-album singles
"Studio"	2018	—	—	—	—	—	—	—	—		Non-album singles
"Bleed It"	2019	— (Note: "Bleed It" did not enter the Billboard Hot 100, but did peak at number two on the Bubbling Under Hot 100 chart.)	46	—	—	—	—	—	—	RIAA: Gold	Dirt Bag
"West Coast" (with G-Eazy or remix featuring YG and Allblack)	2019	— (Note: "West Coast" did not chart on the Billboard Hot 100, but did peak at number one on the Bubbling Under Hot 100 chart.)	37	—	81	—	—	—	—	RIAA: Gold	Beats (soundtrack)
"Stop Cappin" (solo or with The Game)	2019	— (Note: "Stop Cappin" did not chart on the Billboard Hot 100, but did peak at number 15 on the Bubbling Under Hot 100 chart.)	— (Note: "Stop Cappin" did not enter the Hot R&B/Hip-Hop Songs chart, but peaked at number two on the Bubbling Under R&B/Hip-Hop Songs chart.)	—	—	—	—	—	—		Dirt Bag
"Daddy" (featuring Rich the Kid)	2019	78	30	36	72	—	—	—	—	RIAA: Platinum	Dirt Bag
"Bussdown" (featuring Offset)	2019	—	—	—	—	—	— (Note: "Bussdown" did not enter the NZ Top 40 Singles Chart, but peaked at number 23 on the NZ Hot Singles Chart.)	—	—		Dirt Bag
"Bop" (with Tyga and YG)	2019	—	—	—	—	—	— (Note: "Bop" did not enter the NZ Top 40 Singles Chart, but peaked at number nine on the NZ Hot Singles Chart.)	—	—		Legendary
"Close Up" (featuring Jeremih)	2019	—	—	—	—	—	—	—	—		Find the Beat
"First Class" (featuring Gunna)	2019	— (Note: "First Class" did not chart on the Billboard Hot 100, but did peak at number 18 on the Bubbling Under Hot 100 chart.)	—	—	—	—	— (Note: "First Class" did not enter the NZ Top 40 Singles Chart, but peaked at number 39 on the NZ Hot Singles Chart.)	—	—		Find the Beat
"Obama" (featuring DaBaby)	2020	—	—	—	—	—	—	—	—		Find the Beat
"Holy Moly" (featuring NLE Choppa)	2020	—	—	—	—	—	— (Note: "Holy Moly" did not enter the NZ Top 40 Singles Chart, but peaked at number 32 on the NZ Hot Singles Chart.)	—	—		Find the Beat
"Tour" (featuring Asian Doll, Glokk 9, NLE Choppa, Sada Baby, and Kiddo Curry)	2020	—	—	—	—	—	—	—	—		Famous Cryp Reloaded
"Respect My Cryppin'" (solo or featuring Snoop Dogg)	2020	—	—	—	—	—	—	—	—		Famous Cryp
"Outside (Better Days)" (with OG Bobby Billions)	2021	— (Note: "Outside (Better Days)" did not chart on the Billboard Hot 100, but did peak at number 19 on the Bubbling Under Hot 100 chart.)	—	32	—	—	— (Note: "Outside (Better Days)" did not enter the NZ Top 40 Singles Chart, but peaked at number 12 on the NZ Hot Singles Chart.)	—	—	RIAA: Gold	Holy Goat 2
"TikTok" (solo or featuring Justina Valentine)	2021	—	—	—	—	—	—	—	—		Non-album single
"—" denotes a recording that did not chart or was not released in that territory.

==== As featured artist ====
Title	Year	Peak chart positions					Certifications	Album
Title	Year	US	US R&B/HH	CAN	NZ Hot	UK	Certifications	Album
"Slide" (French Montana featuring Blueface and Lil Tjay)	2019	90	33	54	13	81	RIAA: Gold	Montana
"Shotta Flow (Remix)" (NLE Choppa featuring Blueface)	2019	—	—	—	40	—	RIAA: 2× Platinum	Cottonwood
"FULU$" (Farid Bang featuring Musiye and Blueface)	2019	—	—	—	—	—		Torremolinos
"Moonwalking in Calabasas (Remix)" (DDG featuring Blueface)	2020	—	—	—	—	—	RIAA: Platinum; BPI: Silver	Die 4 Respect
"Curvy" (with Jay1 and The Plug)	2020	—	—	—	—	—		Non-album single
"Proud of U (Remix)" (1TakeJay featuring Blueface)	2020	—	—	—	—	—		Compton Globetrotter
"W Hotel" (Like Mike featuring Smokepurpp and Blueface)	2021	—	—	—	—	—		Non-album single
"—" denotes a recording that did not chart or was not released in that territory.

=== Other charted songs ===
Title	Year	Peak chart positions	Album
Title	Year	NZ Hot	Album
"Bussin" (featuring Lil Pump)	2019	39	Dirt Bag

== Boxing record ==
=== Exhibitions ===
2 fights	1 win	1 loss
By knockout	1	0
By decision	0	1

No.	Result	Record	Opponent	Type	Round, time	Date	Location	Notes
2	Loss	1–1	Chibu	UD	6	Mar 14, 2026	BrandRisk Warehouse, Miami, Florida, U.S.	
1	Win	1–0	Ed Matthews	TKO	5 (5), 2:59	Apr 22, 2023	Wembley Arena, London, England	

=== Amateur ===
1 fight	1 win	0 losses
By decision	1	0

No.	Result	Record	Opponent	Type	Round, time	Date	Location	Notes
1	Win	1–0	Kane Trujillo	UD	3	July 23, 2021	Florida State Fairgrounds, Tampa Bay, Florida, U.S.	
