= Fast (Sueco song) =

2019 single by Sueco the Child

Single by SuecoTheChild

from the EP Miscreant
- Released: May 10, 2019
- Genre: Trap
- Length: 2:24
- Label: Atlantic
- Songwriters: William Schultz; Dean Straub; Jad Antoury; Max Louis
- Producers: SuecoTheChild; KenzDean; Louis

SuecoTheChild singles chronology
"Insane" (2019)	"Fast" (2019)	"Fishscale" (2019)

Music video
- "Fast" on YouTube

Remix cover
- Cover art of the official remix featuring Offset and A Boogie Wit Da Hoodie.

"Fast" (stylized in all lowercase) is a song by American rapper SuecoTheChild, first released in April 2019 via SoundCloud. It became his breakout hit through gaining traction on the video-sharing app TikTok, following which it was released on May 10, 2019, as the lead single from his second EP Miscreant (2019).

== Composition ==
"Fast" is a trap song, containing a siren-like sound in the instrumental.

== Release and promotion ==
SuecoTheChild uploaded the song to SoundCloud on April 1, 2019. After discovering TikTok's contribution to the popularity of many songs such as "Old Town Road" by Lil Nas X, Sueco made an account and posted a video set to the song. He then asked his friend Lukas Daly, a skateboarder and TikTok star, to share a video featuring the song. As a result of the video, the song immediately gained the attention of TikTok influencers and was soon used in over three million TikToks. Such videos particularly used the bass-heavy first 15 seconds of the song. The success of the song led to Sueco signing to Atlantic Records. The song was released to streaming services on May 10, 2019, and later appeared on Sueco's second EP Miscreant.

== Music video ==
An official music video premiered on June 19, 2019. It critiques the concept of "clout", and sees SuecoTheChild and his crew causing mischief, such as running amok in a department store, posing next to cars that do not belong to them, riding horses, and "making beats on a woman's buttocks".

== Remixes ==
An official remix of the song featuring American rappers Offset and A Boogie Wit Da Hoodie was released on June 25, 2019, debuting on Zane Lowe's World First on his radio show Beats 1. It sees the featured artists rapping about the wealth, success and sex in their lives. A second remix of the song with Offset and producer Y2K was released on July 26, 2019. The first remix appears on the deluxe edition of Sueco's debut studio album It Was Fun While It Lasted (2022).

== Certifications ==
Certifications for "Fast"
Region	Certification	Certified units/sales
Canada (Music Canada)	2× Platinum	160,000^{‡}
United States (RIAA)	Platinum	1,000,000^{‡}
^{‡} Sales+streaming figures based on certification alone.
