= Respect My Cryppin' =

Song by Blueface

Single by Blueface

from the album Famous Cryp
- Released: May 26, 2018
- Genre: West Coast hip hop; gangsta rap
- Length: 2:21
- Label: Fifth Amendment; eOne
- Songwriters: Johnathan Porter; Hamish Muir
- Producer: Laudiano

Blueface singles chronology
"Thotiana" (2018)	"Respect My Cryppin'" (2018)	"Bleed It" (2019)

Music video
- "Respect My Cryppin'" on YouTube

"Respect My Cryppin'" (also titled "Respect My Crypn") is a song by American rapper Blueface. It was released on May 26, 2018 as the second single from his debut mixtape Famous Cryp (2018). In October 2018, the song went viral after its music video was released, leading to Blueface's rise to fame. A remix featuring fellow American rapper Snoop Dogg was released a month later.

== Background ==
On October 8, 2018, the music video was uploaded onto WorldstarHipHop's YouTube channel. The song quickly became a viral Internet meme due to Blueface's style of offbeat rapping, and eventually led to more of his music receiving attention. The video gained two million views on YouTube in a month.

The lyrics "Mop the floor, hide the wet sign just to catch him slippin'" received the most attention.

== Composition ==
In the song, Blueface expresses loyalty to the Crips gang and demands respect for his gang affiliation. The instrumental was produced by Laudiano and contains an "excessively vibrant, fluid thing with a sticky bass drum".

== Music video ==
The music video was released on October 8, 2018. It sees Blueface hanging with fellow Crips and them flashing gang signs.

== Remix ==
The official remix of the song features American rapper Snoop Dogg, and was released on July 24, 2020, as a track from the reloaded edition of Famous Cryp. Two music videos of the remix have been released. The first is computer-animated and features "electric blue graphics". In the second, Bluefaces challenges Snoop Dogg to a basketball competition.
