= Uno (Ambjaay song) =

2019 single by Ambjaay

Single by Ambjaay

from the EP It Cost to Live Like This, Pt. 2
- Released: May 10, 2019
- Length: 3:31 (original version); 1:49 (single version)
- Label: Columbia
- Songwriters: Jayvon May; Marquise Robinson
- Producer: Almighty Quise

Ambjaay singles chronology
"Choppa Go Blocka Blocka" (2019)	"Uno" (2019)	"Ice Cream" (2019)

Music video
- "Uno" on YouTube

"Uno" is a song by American rapper Ambjaay, released as a single by Columbia Records on May 10, 2019. It is the lead single from his second EP It Cost to Live Like This, Pt. 2. The song went viral on the social media platform TikTok in summer 2019, was popularized on Triller by Cassidy Semerad, and has since been streamed over 50 million times on Spotify and its music video has been viewed over 43 million times on YouTube. It debuted at number 82 on the US Billboard Hot 100 in August 2019. Billboard ranked it 78th on their 100 Best Songs of 2019 list.

== Background ==
The song is the first charting song by California-based rapper Ambjaay. A longer version of the song was released with more verses before it was cut down for wider commercial release. Billboard called the song an "L.A. working-class song made to loosen you up around congested freeways, and feel okay after spending that much on post-shift cocktails".

== Remix ==
An official remix of the song was released on October 4, 2019, featuring guest verses from rappers Tyga and Lil Pump.

== Music video ==
The video was shot in a Bell, California taco restaurant that is turned into a club after the boss goes home.

== Charts ==
Chart (2019)	Peak position
Canada (Canadian Hot 100)	96
US Billboard Hot 100	82
US Rhythmic (Billboard)	19

== Certifications ==
Region	Certification	Certified units/sales
Canada (Music Canada)	Gold	40,000^{‡}
United States (RIAA)	Platinum	1,000,000^{‡}
^{‡} Sales+streaming figures based on certification alone.
