= Thotiana =

2018 single by Blueface

- Remix single cover

Single by Blueface

from the album Famous Cryp
- Released: February 2, 2018
- Recorded: 2017
- Studio: The Spot-LA
- Genre: Dirty rap
- Length: 2:09
- Label: Fifth Amendment; eOne
- Songwriters: Johnathan Porter; John Nathaniel
- Producer: Scum Beatz

Blueface singles chronology
"Thotiana" (2018)	"Respect My Cryppin'" (2018)

Music video
- "Thotiana" on YouTube

"Thotiana" (originally titled "Thothiana" and originally stylized in lowercase) is a song by American rapper Blueface. Its music video premiered on WorldStarHipHop's YouTube channel on July 5, 2018. It was released as a single from Blueface's debut mixtape, Famous Cryp (2018), on February 2, 2018. The song was written by Blueface and produced by Scum Beatz. Cardi B and YG feature on the official remixes of the song, each with a music video; a third and final remix with both artists would later be released. Billboard magazine ranked "Thotiana" as the 26th best song of 2019, calling it "one of the catchiest songs of the year".

== Meaning ==
"Thotiana" takes its name for the slang acronym "Thot", or "that ho over there." Jon Caramanica of The New York Times described the dance associated with the song as "the comically sexual bust down, in which [Blueface] yanks at the waistband of his pants while studiously gyrating".

== Remixes ==
=== YG remix ===
Blueface released a remix of the song featuring American rapper YG on YouTube in January 2019, with a music video directed by Cole Bennett. In this video, Blueface reprises the role of a top prospect high school quarterback, referencing the rapper's experiences playing football at high school and college. The video somewhat explains Blueface's decision to quit football and enter the rap game, as the rapper is shown neglecting his football coach, more interested in fame, money and success.

=== Cardi B remix ===
Blueface teased a second official remix, featuring and written by Cardi B, on his social media pages in early February 2019. This remix's music video was also directed by Bennett and premiered on YouTube on February 16, 2019. The video finds Blueface and Cardi in a warehouse performing next to an all-red car painted with paisley-inspired designs, which is also seen flying through the clouds. Cardi wears bandana-print chaps and a matching cowboy hat in the clip. On February 18, 2019, Blueface released the final remix to music platforms, with him, Cardi B and YG on the same track together. The music video with Cardi B has received more than 200 million views on YouTube. Her remix was awarded among the Winning R&B/Hip-Hop Songs at the 2020 ASCAP Rhythm & Soul Music Awards, and was nominated for Best Remix at the 2020 iHeartRadio Music Awards.

=== Others ===
A third and final official remix featuring the verses of both Cardi B and YG was released shortly after Cardi B's remix was released. Non-official remixes have been released by Tyga, Young M.A, Desiigner, Nicki Minaj, Saucy Santana on his SoundCloud account and Soulja Boy.

== Commercial performance ==
"Thotiana" debuted at number 75 on the US Billboard Hot 100, becoming Blueface's first entry on the chart. Following the release of its official remixes, the song entered the top 10 at number 9, and later peaked at number 8 on the chart.

== Charts ==
=== Weekly charts ===
Chart (2019)	Peak position
Belgium (Ultratip Bubbling Under Flanders)	6
Canada (Canadian Hot 100)	12
France (SNEP)	167
Iceland (Tónlistinn)	35
Ireland (IRMA)	19
Italy (FIMI)	80
Lithuania (AGATA)	25
Netherlands (Single Top 100)	59
New Zealand (Recorded Music NZ)	9
Slovakia Singles Digital (ČNS IFPI)	34
Sweden (Sverigetopplistan)	59
Switzerland (Schweizer Hitparade)	56
UK Singles (Official Charts)	15
UK Indie (Official Charts)	1
UK Hip Hop/R&B (Official Charts)	5
US Billboard Hot 100	8
US Hot R&B/Hip-Hop Songs (Billboard)	4
US Rhythmic (Billboard)	9

=== Year-end charts ===
Chart (2019)	Position
Canada (Canadian Hot 100)	56
US Billboard Hot 100	47
US Hot R&B/Hip-Hop Songs (Billboard)	21
US Rhythmic (Billboard)	43
US Rolling Stone Top 100	42

== Certifications ==
Region	Certification	Certified units/sales
Denmark (IFPI Danmark)	Gold	45,000^{‡}
Italy (FIMI)	Gold	25,000^{‡}
New Zealand (RMNZ)	Gold	15,000^{‡}
United Kingdom (BPI)	Gold	400,000^{‡}
United States (RIAA)	Platinum	1,000,000^{‡}
^{‡} Sales+streaming figures based on certification alone.

== Release history ==
Region	Date	Format	Version	Label	Ref.
United States	January 29, 2019	Urban contemporary radio	Original	eOne	
Various	February 18, 2019	Digital download; streaming	Remix with Cardi B and YG	5th Amendment; eOne	
