= Free Spirit World Tour =

2019 concert tour by Khalid

- Tour by Khalid
- Associated album: Free Spirit
- Start date: May 18, 2019
- End date: December 5, 2019
- Legs: 3
- No. of shows: 37 in North America; 21 in Europe; 6 in Oceania; 63 in total

Khalid concert chronology
- Roxy Tour (2018); Free Spirit World Tour (2019); It's Always Summer Somewhere Tour (2026)

The Free Spirit World Tour was the fourth headlining concert tour by American singer Khalid, in support of his second studio album, Free Spirit (2019). It began on June 20, 2019 in Glendale at Gila River Arena, and concluded on December 5, 2019, in Sydney, at Qudos Bank Arena.

== Background ==
On April 1, 2019, the singer announced he will be going on his first ever arena tour to promote Free Spirit. Dates were first announced in North America, with Clairo was announced as the opening act. On April 8, 2019, dates were announced for Europe and Oceania, with Mabel and Raye announced as opening acts for Europe.

Due to the COVID-19 Pandemic, the Asian leg of the Free Spirit World Tour was postponed indefinitely, but they were never held and tickets were refunded.

== Set list ==
This set list is representative of the concert in Glendale on June 20, 2019. It does not represent all concerts for the duration of the tour.

1. "Free Spirit"
2. "8teen"
3. "Twenty One"
4. "Hundred"
5. "Saved"
6. "My Bad"
7. "Bad Luck"
8. "Bluffin'"
9. "Vertigo"
10. "Motion"
11. "Better"
12. "Right Back"
13. "Location"
14. "Silence"
15. "American Teen"
16. "Another Sad Love Song"
17. "Heaven"
18. "Alive"
19. "Paradise"
20. "Self"
21. "Talk"
22. "Outta My Head"
23. "Young Dumb & Broke"
24. "Eastside"
25. "Love Lies"
26. "OTW"
27. "Intro"
28. "Keep Me"
29. "Salem's Interlude"
30. "Saturday Nights"

=== Notes ===
- During the first show in London, Ed Sheeran appeared as a special guest to perform "Beautiful People" with Khalid.

== Tour dates ==
List of concerts, showing date, city, country, venue, opening acts, tickets sold, number of available tickets and amount of gross revenue
Date	City	Country	Venue	Opening act(s)	Attendance	Revenue
Leg 1 — North America
April 26, 2019 (Note: The concert on April 26, 2019 at the Carrier Dome in Syracuse was part of Block Party, a Syracuse University music festival)	Syracuse	United States	Carrier Dome	Rico Nasty Kenny Beats	—N/a	—N/a
May 18, 2019 (Note: The concert on May 18, 2019 at Gulf Shores Public Beach in Gulf Shores is part of Hangout Music Festival.)	Gulf Shores	United States	Gulf Shores Public Beach	—N/a	—N/a	—N/a
June 20, 2019	Glendale	United States	Gila River Arena	Clairo	—	—
June 22, 2019	Las Vegas	United States	MGM Grand Garden Arena	Clairo	10,470 / 12,174	$672,494
June 23, 2019	San Diego	United States	Pechanga Arena	Clairo	10,320 / 11,727	$756,932
June 25, 2019	Los Angeles	United States	Staples Center	Clairo	23,677 / 26,253	$1,574,747
June 26, 2019	Los Angeles	United States	Staples Center	Clairo	23,677 / 26,253	$1,574,747
June 28, 2019	Oakland	United States	Oracle Arena	Clairo	13,252 / 14,320	$921,605
June 29, 2019	Sacramento	United States	Golden 1 Center	Clairo	13,292 / 13,292	$929,035
July 1, 2019	Portland	United States	Moda Center	Clairo	11,282 / 11,282	$740,020
July 4, 2019	Edmonton	Canada	Rogers Place	Clairo	14,101 / 14,101	$833,025
July 7, 2019	Tacoma	United States	Tacoma Dome	Clairo	14,438 / 14,438	$878,003
July 9, 2019	Spokane	United States	Spokane Veterans Memorial Arena	Clairo	10,196 / 10,196	$601,018
July 12, 2019	Denver	United States	Pepsi Center	Clairo	12,857 / 12,857	$887,867
July 14, 2019	Dallas	United States	American Airlines Center	Clairo	13,196 / 13,196	$875,832
July 16, 2019	San Antonio	United States	AT&T Center	Clairo	13,030 / 13,030	$742,472
July 18, 2019	Houston	United States	Toyota Center	Clairo	11,505 / 11,505	$752,200
July 19, 2019	Oklahoma City	United States	Chesapeake Energy Arena	Clairo	10,189 / 11,448	$656,712
July 21, 2019	Kansas City	United States	Sprint Center	—N/a	13,665 / 13,665	$901.588
July 23, 2019	Saint Paul	United States	Xcel Energy Center	Clairo	15,314 / 15,314	$1,000,655
July 25, 2019	Chicago	United States	United Center	Clairo	15,438 / 15,438	$1,111,255
July 26, 2019	Columbus	United States	Nationwide Arena	Clairo	14,169 / 14,169	$926,432
July 28, 2019	Detroit	United States	Little Caesars Arena	Clairo	14.351 / 14,351	$1,029,250
July 29, 2019	Pittsburgh	United States	PPG Paints Arena	Clairo	12,178 / 13,531	$752,422
July 31, 2019	New York City	United States	Madison Square Garden	Clairo	27,530 / 27,530	$2,176,940
August 1, 2019	New York City	United States	Madison Square Garden	Clairo	27,530 / 27,530	$2,176,940
August 3, 2019	Washington, D.C.	United States	Capital One Arena	Clairo	13,787 / 14,361	$987,941
August 4, 2019	Hartford	United States	XL Center	Clairo	8,708 / 8,708	$442,033
August 6, 2019	Toronto	Canada	Scotiabank Arena	Clairo	24,954 / 24,954	$1,494,004
August 7, 2019	Toronto	Canada	Scotiabank Arena	Clairo	24,954 / 24,954	$1,494,004
August 8, 2019	Montreal	Canada	Bell Centre	Clairo	12,532 / 14,099	$787,692
August 10, 2019	Boston	United States	TD Garden	Clairo	12,845 / 12,845	$924,613
August 11, 2019	Philadelphia	United States	Wells Fargo Center	Clairo	13,572 / 13,572	$961,662
August 13, 2019	Charlotte	United States	Spectrum Center	Clairo	—	—
August 14, 2019	Atlanta	United States	State Farm Arena	Clairo	10,490 / 10,490	$665,076
August 16, 2019	Orlando	United States	Amway Center	Clairo	12,710 / 12,710	$816,641
August 17, 2019	Miami	United States	American Airlines Arena	Clairo	11,680 / 11,680	$755,631
Leg 2 — Europe
September 8, 2019 (Note: The concert on September 8, 2019 at Olympiastadion in Berlin is part of Lollapalooza Berlin.)	Berlin	Germany	Olympiastadion	—N/a	—N/a	—N/a
September 9, 2019	Hamburg	Germany	Barclaycard Arena	Mabel; Raye	—	—
September 11, 2019	Stockholm	Sweden	Hovet	Mabel; Raye	—	—
September 13, 2019	Oslo	Norway	Oslo Spektrum	Mabel; Raye	—	—
September 14, 2019	Copenhagen	Denmark	Royal Arena	Mabel; Raye	11,993 / 11,993	$980,899
September 17, 2019	London	England	The O_{2} Arena	Mabel; Raye	27,817 / 29,592	$1,584,820
September 18, 2019	London	England	The O_{2} Arena	Mabel; Raye	27,817 / 29,592	$1,584,820
September 20, 2019	Glasgow	Scotland	SSE Hydro	Mabel; Raye	9,694 / 9,694	$502,494
September 21, 2019	Birmingham	England	Resorts World Arena	Mabel; Raye	13,625 / 14,972	$652,242
September 22, 2019	Leeds	England	First Direct Arena	Mabel; Raye	—	—
September 24, 2019	Dublin	Ireland	3Arena	Mabel; Raye	12,747 / 12,747	$698,989
September 25, 2019	Belfast	Northern Ireland	SSE Arena	Mabel; Raye	—	—
September 28, 2019	Frankfurt	Germany	Jahrhunderthalle	Mabel; Raye	—	—
September 29, 2019	Antwerp	Belgium	Lotto Arena	Mabel; Raye	6,147 / 6,403	$251,825
October 1, 2019	Amsterdam	Netherlands	Ziggo Dome	Mabel; Raye	—	—
October 2, 2019	Oberhausen	Germany	König Pilsener Arena	Mabel; Raye	9,553 / 9,553	$420,298
October 4, 2019	Paris	France	L'Olympia	Mabel; Raye	—	—
October 5, 2019	Paris	France	L'Olympia	Mabel; Raye	—	—
October 6, 2019	Esch-sur-Alzette	Luxembourg	Rockhal	Mabel; Raye	4,621 / 4,621	$206,191
October 8, 2019	Zürich	Switzerland	Samsung Hall	Mabel; Raye	—	—
October 9, 2019	Munich	Germany	Zenith Munich	Mabel; Raye	5,671 / 5,671	$297,109
Leg 3 — Oceania
November 20, 2019	Auckland	New Zealand	Spark Arena	—N/a	16,786 / 21,800	$1,388,730
November 21, 2019	Auckland	New Zealand	Spark Arena	—N/a	16,786 / 21,800	$1,388,730
November 26, 2019	Brisbane	Australia	Brisbane Entertainment Centre	—N/a	10,292 / 11,309	$814,881
November 28, 2019	Melbourne	Australia	Rod Laver Arena	—N/a	13,280 / 13,551	$1,078,462
December 2, 2019	Adelaide	Australia	Adelaide Entertainment Centre	—N/a	6,465 / 8,183	$513,070
December 4, 2019	Sydney	Australia	Qudos Bank Arena	—N/a	30,675 / 31,301	$2,350,897
December 5, 2019	Sydney	Australia	Qudos Bank Arena	—N/a	30,675 / 31,301	$2,350,897

=== Cancelled shows ===
List of cancelled concerts, showing date, city, country, venue and reason for cancellation
Date	City	Country	Venue	Reason
March 24, 2020	Bangkok	Thailand	Impact Arena	COVID-19 pandemic
March 26, 2020	Singapore		Singapore Indoor Stadium	COVID-19 pandemic
March 28, 2020	Jakarta	Indonesia	Istora Senayan	COVID-19 pandemic
April 2, 2020	Pasay	Philippines	Mall of Asia Arena	COVID-19 pandemic
April 4, 2020	Kuala Lumpur	Malaysia	Malawati Stadium	COVID-19 pandemic
April 7, 2020	Tokyo	Japan	Toyosu Pit	COVID-19 pandemic
April 9, 2020	Seoul	South Korea	Olympic Hall	COVID-19 pandemic
April 12, 2020	Mumbai	India	JioWorld Garden	COVID-19 pandemic
April 14, 2020	Bangalore	India	Ozone Urbana	COVID-19 pandemic
