= Roxy Tour =

2018 concert tour by Khalid

- Tour by Khalid
- Associated album: American Teen
- Start date: January 27, 2018
- End date: June 7, 2018
- Legs: 1
- No. of shows: 25 in North America
- Attendance: 158,757
- Box office: $8,748,392

Khalid concert chronology
- American Teen Tour (2017–18); Roxy Tour (2018); Free Spirit World Tour (2019)

Roxy Tour was the third headlining concert tour by American singer Khalid, in support of his debut studio album American Teen (2017). The tour began on January 27, 2018, in New York City at the Radio City Music Hall, and concluded on June 7, 2018, in Raleigh, at Red Hat Amphitheater.

== Development ==
Khalid embarked on The Location Tour and American Teen Tour to support his debut album, American Teen. After earning five nominations at the 60th Grammy Awards, Khalid announced that he would embark on a headlining concert tour titled Roxy Tour. The tour got its name from Khalid's adopted pit bull, Roxy, whom he rescued from a Los Angeles animal shelter. Then, it was announced that $1 from every ticket sold would be given to local animal shelters on each tour stop. On April 18, it was announced that American-Canadian pop boy band PrettyMuch would join the tour as the opening act.

== Commercial performance ==
According to Billboard Boxscore, the tour generated $8 million in ticket sales and played to 158,727 fans over 23 shows. The highest sold ticket count was at San Francisco's Bill Graham Civic Auditorium on May 5 and 6, playing for 17,482. Vancouver's Rogers Arena hosted the largest crowd on a single show of the tour with 13,470 in attendance on May 2.

== Set list ==
This set list is from the concert on May 30, 2018, in Toronto, Canada. It is not intended to represent all tour dates.

1. "8TEEN"
2. "Winter"
3. "American Teen"
4. "Therapy"
5. "Coaster"
6. "Another Sad Love Song"
7. "The Ways"
8. "Saved"
9. "Shot Down"
10. "Hopeless"
11. "Cold Blooded"
12. "Angels"
13. "Young Dumb & Broke"
14. "Silence"
15. "Love Lies"
16. "Rollin"
17. "Let's Go"
18. "Location"
19. "OTW"

== Tour dates ==
List of concerts, showing date, city, country, venue, opening acts, tickets sold, number of available tickets and amount of gross revenue
| Date | City | Country | Venue | Opening acts | Attendance | Revenue |
North America
| January 27, 2018 | New York City | United States | Radio City Music Hall | DJ Chase B | 5,960 / 5,960 | $414,095 |
| May 1, 2018 | Portland | United States | Theater of the Clouds | PrettyMuch | 7,974 / 7,974 | $424,002 |
| May 2, 2018 | Vancouver | Canada | Rogers Arena | PrettyMuch | 13,470 / 13,470 | $579,478 |
| May 3, 2018 | Seattle | United States | WaMu Theater | PrettyMuch | 7,065 / 7,065 | $386,519 |
| May 5, 2018 | San Francisco | United States | Bill Graham Civic Auditorium | PrettyMuch | 17,482 / 17,482 | $880,135 |
| May 6, 2018 | San Francisco | United States | Bill Graham Civic Auditorium | PrettyMuch | 17,482 / 17,482 | $880,135 |
| May 7, 2018 | Davis | United States | ARC Pavilion | PrettyMuch | 5,426 / 5,426 | $265,625 |
| May 9, 2018 | Los Angeles | United States | Greek Theatre | PrettyMuch | 11,106 / 11,106 | $762,820 |
| May 10, 2018 | Los Angeles | United States | Greek Theatre | PrettyMuch | 11,106 / 11,106 | $762,820 |
| May 11, 2018 | Phoenix | United States | Rawhide Event Center | PrettyMuch | — | |
| May 13, 2018 | West Valley City | United States | Maverik Center | PrettyMuch | — | |
| May 14, 2018 | Morrison | United States | Red Rocks Amphitheatre | PrettyMuch | 9,350 / 9,350 | $628,667 |
| May 16, 2018 | Allen | United States | Allen Event Center | PrettyMuch | 6,642 / 6,642 | $344,067 |
| May 17, 2018 | Cedar Park | United States | H-E-B Center | PrettyMuch | 6,612 / 6,612 | $327,590 |
| May 18, 2018 | Sugar Land | United States | Smart Financial Centre | PrettyMuch | 6,035 / 6,035 | $344,046 |
| May 22, 2018 | Duluth | United States | Infinite Energy Arena | PrettyMuch | 8,700 / 9,385 | $427,103 |
| May 23, 2018 | Charlotte | United States | Metro Credit Union Amphitheatre | PrettyMuch | 4,903 / 4,903 | $271,687 |
| May 25, 2018 | Philadelphia | United States | Festival Pier at Penn's Landing | PrettyMuch | 8,500 / 8,500 | $470,100 |
| May 26, 2018 | Wallingford | United States | Toyota Oakdale Theatre | PrettyMuch | 4,355 / 4,355 | $276,551 |
| May 30, 2018 | Toronto | Canada | RBC Echo Beach | PrettyMuch | 13,862 / 13,862 | $723,489 |
| May 31, 2018 | Toronto | Canada | RBC Echo Beach | PrettyMuch | 13,862 / 13,862 | $723,489 |
| June 1, 2018 | Rochester | United States | Meadow Brook Amphitheatre | PrettyMuch | 7,498 / 7,498 | $371,966 |
| June 4, 2018 | Baltimore | United States | Pier Six Pavilion | PrettyMuch | 8,167 / 8,167 | $465,849 |
| June 5, 2018 | Baltimore | United States | Pier Six Pavilion | PrettyMuch | 8,167 / 8,167 | $465,849 |
| June 7, 2018 | Raleigh | United States | Red Hat Amphitheater | PrettyMuch | 5,620 / 5,620 | $284,025 |
| Total | | | | | 158,727 / 159,412 (99%) | $8,748,392 |
