= 18yoman =

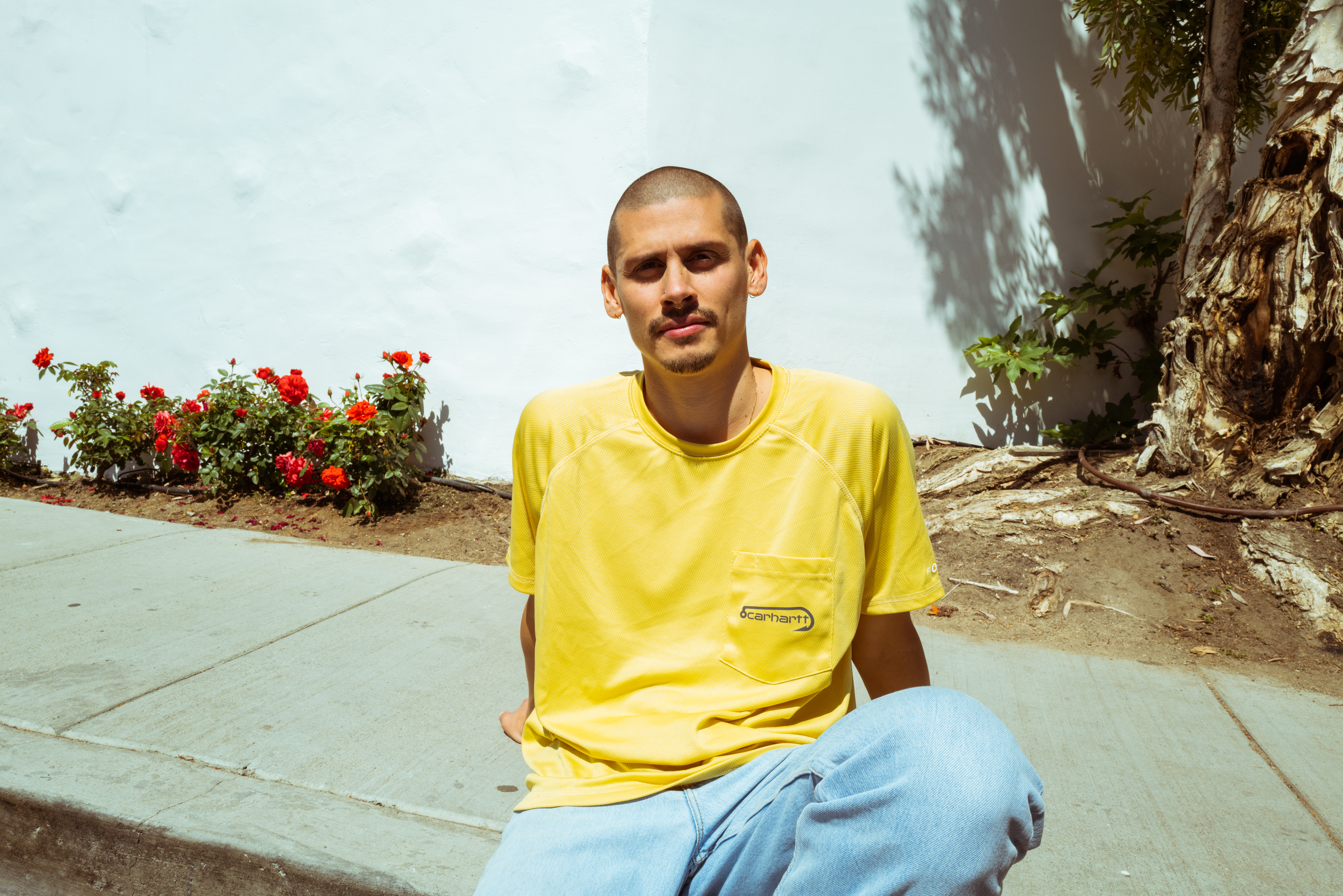
- 18yoman in 2022

Background information
- Also known as: Vin Goodyer
- Born: Vincent Goodyer
- Origin: Sydney, Australia
- Genres: Hip hop; pop; soul; R&B
- Occupations: Record producer; singer; songwriter
- Years active: 2016–present

Vincent Goodyer, known professionally as 18yoman (stylized in 18YOMAN), is an Australian singer, songwriter, and record producer based in Sydney. He is an ARIA Award recipient and co-produced Lil Nas X's album Montero (2021), which received a Grammy Award nomination for Album of the Year.

== Career ==
A Bunaba Australian, 18yoman started working on records alongside regular collaborator Adit Gauchan (Horrorshow, Turquoise Prince), with whom he co-produced Spit Syndicate's 2018 album Orbit. He scored the feature documentary film, Martha: A Picture Story which premiered at Tribeca Film Festival and was nominated for an AACTA Award for Best Score in a Documentary Film.

He later worked on albums from the likes on Triple One and Daniyel before winning an ARIA Award for his production on neo-soul heroine Kaiit's single "Miss Shiney".

In late 2020, he signed with Take a Daytrip imprint No Idle, a joint venture with Universal Music Publishing Group, while also launching his own publishing house Banquet Sounds and signing friend and frequent collaborator Glenn Hopper/LEN20.

18yoman then co-produced two tracks on Kid Cudi's third incarnation of his Man on the Moon album trilogy Man on the Moon III: The Chosen, co-wrote Cordae and Young Thug's single "Wassup" and also featured on Australian soul upstart KYE's single "Gold" featuring Sampa the Great.

Alongside collaborators Billy Ward and Len20, 18yoman arranged, composed and recorded the strings for Lil Nas X's debut album Montero released on Columbia, while also co-writing "Am I Dreaming" featuring Miley Cyrus, alongside Ward, Take a Daytrip and Omer Fedi.

In 2022, 18yoman received writing and production credits on Rico Nasty's mixtape Las Ruinas, alongside Roy Lenzo and Grasps, before working on YG's 2022 single "Alone".

== Awards and nominations ==
=== AACTA Awards ===
The Australian Academy of Cinema and Television Arts Awards, (known as the AACTA Awards), are presented annually by the Australian Academy of Cinema and Television Arts (AACTA).

Year	Nominee / work	Award	Result	Ref.
2019 AACTA Award	Martha: A Picture Story	Best Original Music Score in a Documentary	Nominated	
2022 AACTA Award	Mystery Road: Origin)	Best Original Score in Television	Nominated	

=== APRA Awards ===
The APRA Awards are presented annually from 1982 by the Australasian Performing Right Association (APRA), "honouring composers and songwriters". They commenced in 1982.

Year	Nominee / work	Award	Result	Ref.
2023	Vincent Goodyer (18yoman)	Breakthrough Songwriter of the Year	Pending	

- Nominated − 2022 Grammy Award for Best Album (Lil Nas X's Montero)

== Discography ==
Singles

As 18yoman

- "Eye Catcher" – 2019
- "Full to the Brim" – 2019
- "Swimming" (ft. Mia Elnekave) – 2019
- "Fireflies" – 2020

As featured artist

- "Vinny's Interlude" (UNO Stereo ft. 18yoman) – 2020
- "Gold" (KYE ft. Sampa the Great & 18yoman) – 2021

== Production discography ==
Year	Work	Artist	Label	Writer	Producer
2026	Teary Eyes	YoungBoy Never Broke Again (ft. Burna Boy)	Never Broke Again / Motown	check	check
2022	Livin My Truth	Kid Cudi	Republic	check	check
2022	No Weapon	YG (ft. Nas)	Def Jam	check	check
2022	Alone	YG	Def Jam	check	check
2022	Gotta Get Paid	Rico Nasty	Atlantic	check	check
2022	Messy	Rico Nasty (ft. Teezo Touchdown & Bktherula)	Atlantic	check	check
2022	Planet 4 2	IV Jay	Atlantic	check	check
2022	A.M. FETA MEANS	Rahul	D36	check	check
2022	IDK	Tasman Keith (ft. Phil Fresh)	AWAL	check	check
2021	Wassup	Cordae (ft. Young Thug)	Atlantic	check	
2021	Am I Dreaming	Lil Nas X (ft. Miley Cyrus)	Columbia	check	
2021	Sun Goes Down	Lil Nas X	Columbia	check	
2021	Dreaming of this Day	Chillinit	420Fam	check	check
2021	Tuesday	KYE (ft. Jerome Farah & 18yoman)	Sony	check	check
2021	Sweet and Sour	Amelia Moore	Capitol	check	check
2021	Youtube2MP3	AG Club	COR/TAN	check	check
2021	Who That (Know Me)	Nerve	Independent	check	check
2021	Gold	KYE (ft. Sampa the Great)	Sony Music Australia	check	check
2021	Somebody	Daniyel	COR/TAN	check	check
2021	Good Day	Daniyel	COR/TAN	check	check
2021	Bold Face to the Sun	Daniyel	COR/TAN	check	check
2021	82nd	Daniyel	COR/TAN	check	check
2021	Novocane	Daniyel	COR/TAN	check	check
2021	Don't Judge	Daniyel	COR/TAN	check	check
2021	Good Life	Daniyel	COR/TAN	check	check
2021	Beam	Payday	COR/TAN	check	check
2021	Give It To Me	Pink Sweats	Atlantic	check	
2020	Emotions = Shit	blackbear.	Independent	check	check
2020	Loverose	Triple One	The Orchard	check	check
2020	Milky Mark	Triple One	The Orchard	check	check
2020	Pleasure Island	Triple One	The Orchard	check	check
2020	Skinless Man	Triple One	The Orchard	check	check
2020	Yap! Yap! Yap!	Triple One	The Orchard	check	check
2020	Crylence	Triple One	The Orchard	check	check
2020	The Conformist	Triple One	The Orchard	check	check
2020	Wait 4 Me	Triple One	The Orchard	check	check
2020	Where is He	Triple One	The Orchard	check	check
2020	Playin	UNO Stereo	Warner Music Australia	check	check
2020	Vinny's Interlude	UNO Stereo	Warner Music Australia	check	check
2020	Purple Tape	UNO Stereo	Warner Music Australia	check	check
2020	Need 2 Say	UNO Stereo	Warner Music Australia	check	check
2020	Real	Jharrel Jerome	Independent	check	check
2020	Dear Mama	Ty Fontaine	10K Projects	check	check
2020	Alone On Your Birthday	Daniyel	COR/TAN	check	check
2020	Lost Ones	Daniyel	COR/TAN	check	check
2020	Lord I Know	Kid Cudi	Republic	check	check
2020	4 Da Kidz	Kid Cudi	Republic	check	check
2019	Gypsy Love	Turquoise Prince	Warner Music Australia	check	check
2019	Monday Interlude	Turquoise Prince	Warner Music Australia	check	check
2019	Tuesday Blues	Turquoise Prince	Warner Music Australia	check	check
2019	Catch Up	Turquoise Prince	Warner Music Australia	check	check
2019	Cold Blooded	Turquoise Prince	Warner Music Australia	check	check
2019	Miss Shiney	Kaiit	Independent / Ditto	check	check
2019	So Easy	Triple One	The Orchard	check	check
2018	Wonderland	Spit Syndicate	Independent / AWAL	check	check
2018	Fast Friends	Spit Syndicate	Independent / AWAL	check	check
2018	Contraband & Conversation	Spit Syndicate	Independent / AWAL	check	check
2018	Same Difference	Spit Syndicate	Independent / AWAL	check	check
2018	Late to the Party	Spit Syndicate	Independent / AWAL	check	check
2018	Miracles	Spit Syndicate	Independent / AWAL	check	check
