= Bill Graham Civic Auditorium =

Multi-purpose arena in San Francisco, California

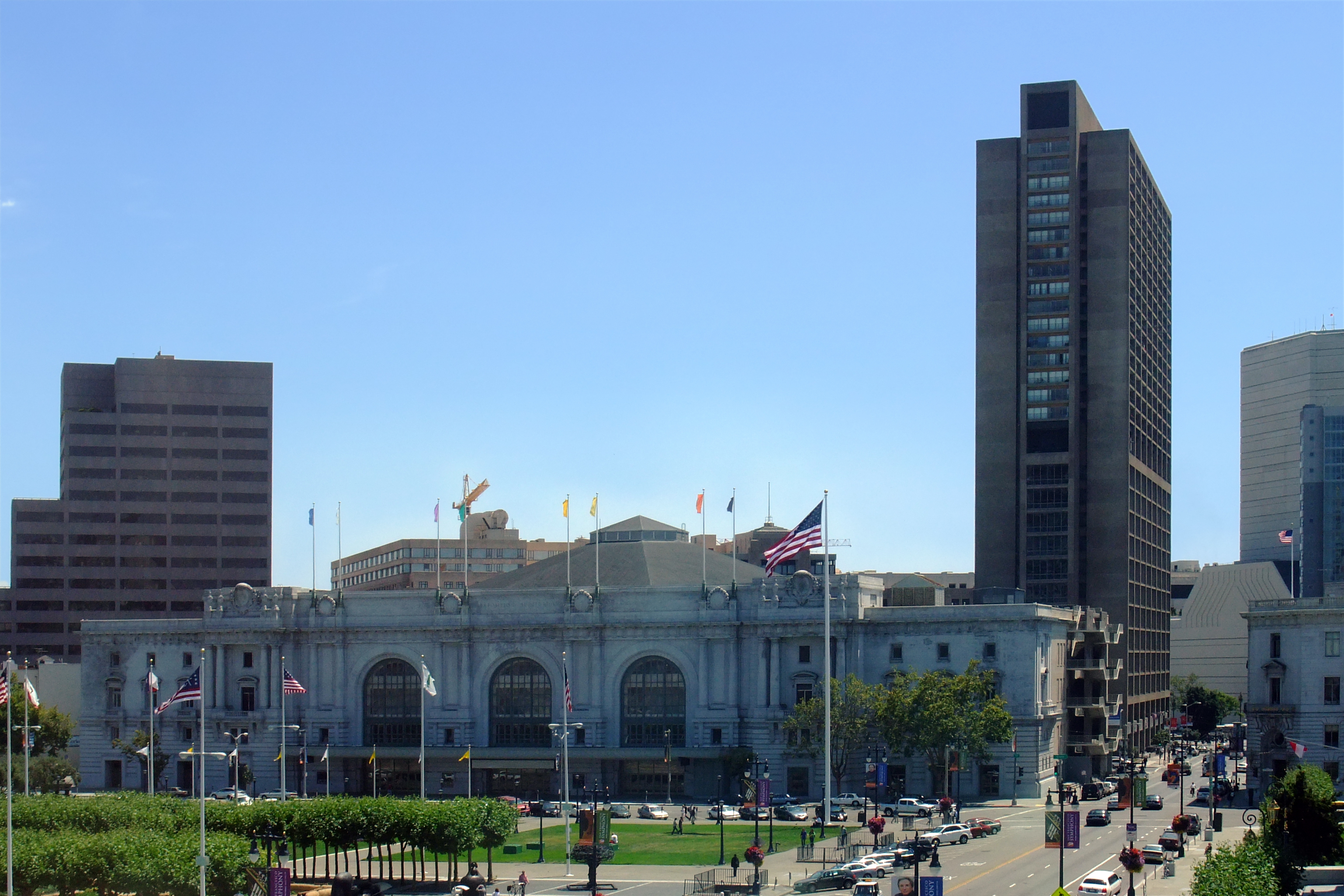
- Exterior of venue viewed from the City Hall (c.2008)

- Location within San Francisco Location within California
- Former names: San Francisco Exposition Auditorium (1915); San Francisco Civic Auditorium (1916–1992)
- Address: 99 Grove St; San Francisco, CA 94102-4720
- Location: Civic Center
- Coordinates: 37.778457°N 122.417369°W
- Owner: City and County of San Francisco
- Operator: Another Planet Entertainment
- Capacity: 8,500
- Public transit: Civic Center

Construction
- Groundbreaking: December 1913
- Opened: March 2, 1915
- Renovated: 1962–1964, 1989–1990, 1994–1996, 2005, 2010
- Cost: $1.7 million ($55.4 million in 2025 dollars)
- Architects: John Galen Howard, Frederick Meyer, John W. Reid Jr.

Tenant
- San Francisco Warriors (NBA) (1964–1967)

Website
- Official website

The Bill Graham Civic Auditorium (formerly San Francisco Civic Auditorium and San Francisco Exposition Auditorium) is a multi-purpose arena in San Francisco, California, named after promoter Bill Graham. The arena holds 8,500 people.

== About the venue ==
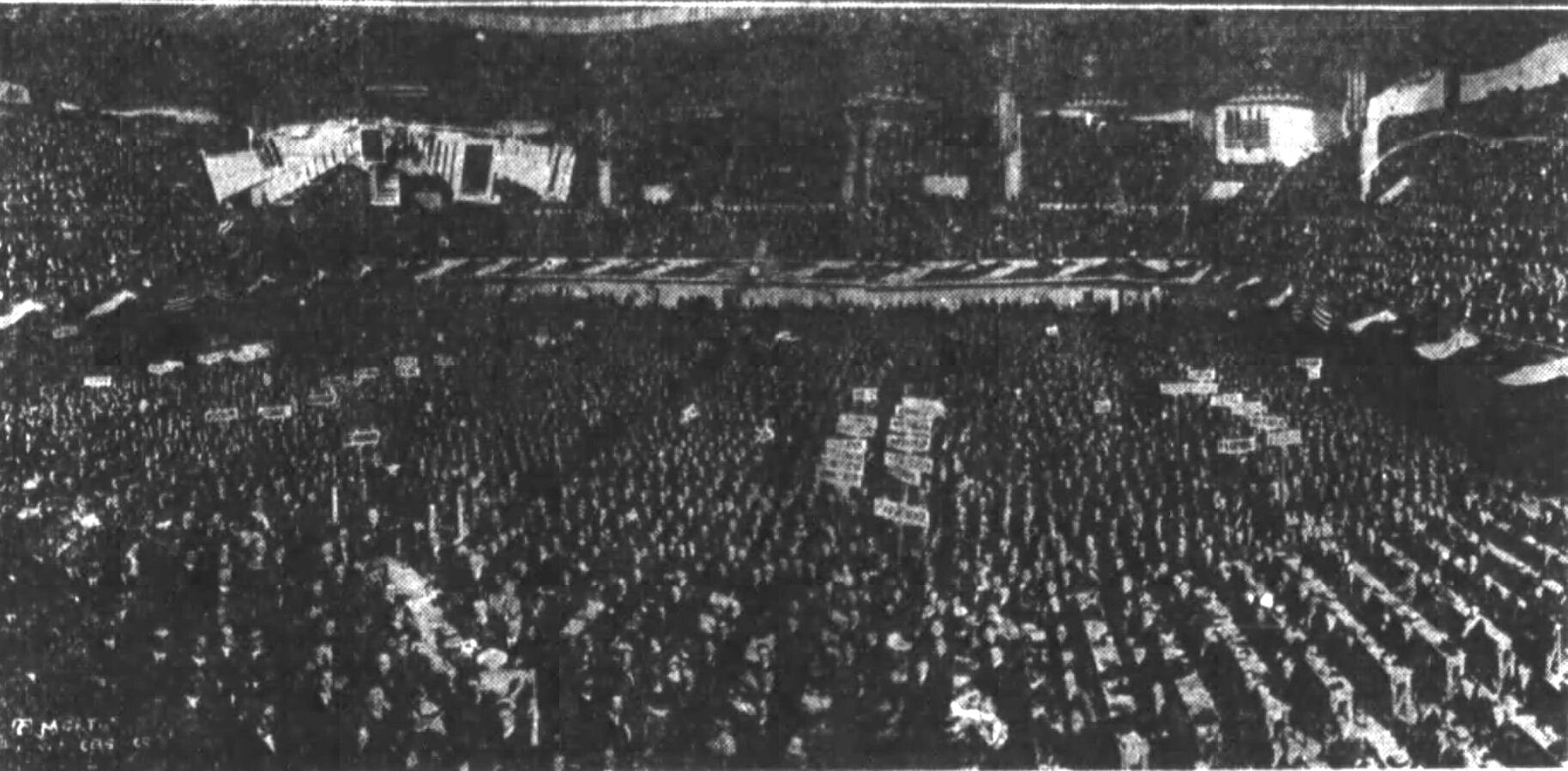
1920 Democratic National Convention

The auditorium was designed by renowned Bay Area architects John Galen Howard, Frederick Herman Meyer and John W. Reid Jr. and built in 1915 as part of the Panama–Pacific International Exposition. The auditorium hosted the 1920 Democratic National Convention, the San Francisco Opera from 1923 to 1932 and again for the 1996 season, and the National AAU boxing trials in 1948. It was the home of the San Francisco Warriors of the National Basketball Association from 1964 to 1967. An underground expansion, named Brooks Hall, was completed in 1958 under the Civic Center Plaza, immediately north of the Civic Auditorium. The famous Mother of All Demos was presented here during the 1968 Fall Joint Computer Conference, and the World Cyber Games 2004 were also held here.

In 1992, the San Francisco Board of Supervisors voted to rename the auditorium after the rock concert impresario Bill Graham, who had died the previous year in a helicopter crash.

Long before Bill Graham came along, James T. Graham (no relation) managed the Civic Auditorium from 1954 to 1970 and booked some of the biggest names in show business there. During Jim Graham's tenure, the Civic Auditorium hosted Elvis Presley (October 26, 1957), Judy Garland (September 13, 1961), Ray Charles, the Tijuana Brass, Donovan, the Jefferson Airplane (June 4, 1966), the Mamas and the Papas (October 10, 1966), The Temptations and Gladys Knight & the Pips (January 26, 1968), Jose Feliciano, Bobby Darin and more, which prompted San Francisco Chronicle columnist Herb Caen to opine that the Board of Supervisors had named the Civic Auditorium after the wrong Graham (January 12, 1993).

Jim Graham signed the Warriors to a contract at the Civic in 1962 when they first moved from Philadelphia to San Francisco. The Warriors would play their first few seasons at the Civic before they moved to the Cow Palace, a larger venue. Jim Graham was manager of the Auditorium when Brooks Hall was built as an adjacent, underground convention center. He also managed Brooks Hall after its dedication on April 11, 1958, and booked American Medical Association conventions, the Harvest Festival, the San Francisco Gift Show and more.

Under Jim Graham's management, the Civic Auditorium also hosted Barnum & Bailey circuses, the San Francisco Roller Derby, Golden Gloves Boxing matches, professional wrestling, Holiday on Ice, the Ice Capades, car shows, the International Dog Show, the Black and White Ball and the Folderol. In addition, President Dwight D. Eisenhower spoke there on August 23, 1956, on the 100th anniversary of the founding of the Republican Party, and a fundraising gala was held there on June 1, 1968, for Democratic presidential hopeful Senator Robert F. Kennedy, four days before he was assassinated in Los Angeles. At the time, the Civic Auditorium was ground zero in San Francisco for conventions and entertainment events. There were no other major venues for large gatherings outside of the Cow Palace, which was considered ill-equipped for such events (despite the fact that it was larger).

Later, the Civic Auditorium arena would continue to host concerts by many other famous artists, spanning many different genres. It is owned by the City and County of San Francisco and since 2010 has been operated by Another Planet Entertainment.

== Concerts ==
Date	Artist	Opening act(s)	Tour / Concert name	Attendance	Revenue	Notes
May 14, 1965	The Rolling Stones		1965 1st American Tour			
February 14, 1982	Prince	Zapp and Roger, The Time	Controversy Tour			
February 15, 1982	Prince	Zapp and Roger, The Time	Controversy Tour			
March 29, 1982	J. Geils Band	U2	October Tour			
March 30, 1982	J. Geils Band	U2	October Tour			
June 17, 1982	Elton John		Jump Up Tour	6,713 / 6,713		
April 3, 1983	Kiss	Mötley Crüe	Creatures of the Night Tour/10th Anniversary Tour			
June 1, 1983	U2		War Tour			
December 15, 1984	U2		The Unforgettable Fire Tour			
April 23, 1985	Madonna	Beastie Boys, Run DMC	The Virgin Tour	8,500 / 8,500	$127,500	
September 25, 1985	Y&T		Down For The Count Tour			
March 30, 1988	Kiss	Anthrax	Crazy Nights World Tour			
October 2, 1993	Luis Miguel		Aries Tour			
April 13, 1996	Oasis	Third Eye Blind	(What's the Story) Morning Glory? Tour			
January 26, 1998	Oasis	Cornershop	Be Here Now Tour			
November 4, 1999	Blink-182		Loserkids Tour			
November 25, 1999	Kid Rock		Devil Without a Cause Tour			
October 13, 2001	Bob Dylan		Never Ending Tour 2001			
September 16, 2004	Beastie Boys	Talib Kweli	Pageant Tour			
September 17, 2004	Beastie Boys	Talib Kweli	Pageant Tour			
November 24, 2004	Green Day	New Found Glory, Sugarcult	American Idiot World Tour			
July 15, 2006	Pearl Jam		Pearl Jam 2006 World Tour			
July 16, 2006	Pearl Jam		Pearl Jam 2006 World Tour			
July 18, 2006	Pearl Jam		Pearl Jam 2006 World Tour			
October 16, 2006	Bob Dylan	Kings of Leon	Never Ending Tour 2006			
October 17, 2006	Bob Dylan	Kings of Leon	Never Ending Tour 2006			
October 29, 2006	Snoop Dogg					
November 7, 2006	Pet Shop Boys		Fundamental Tour			
November 20, 2006	Tenacious D	Neil Hamburger	The Pick of Destiny Tour			
March 1, 2007	Snow Patrol		Eyes Open Tour			
April 9, 2007	Muse		Black Holes and Revelations Tour			
September 27, 2007	Arctic Monkeys		Favourite Worst Nightmare Tour			
December 13, 2009	Lady Gaga	Kid Cudi, Semi Precious Weapons	The Monster Ball Tour	17,000 / 17,000	$840,960	
December 14, 2009	Lady Gaga	Kid Cudi, Semi Precious Weapons	The Monster Ball Tour	17,000 / 17,000	$840,960	
April 9, 2011	Rise Against		Endgame Tour			
June 8, 2011	Bruno Mars	Mayer Hawthorne & the County	Hooligans in Wondaland Tour			
December 10, 2011	Sara Bareilles		Kaleidoscope Heart Tour			
August 17, 2012	Phish		2012 Summer Tour			
August 18, 2012	Phish		2012 Summer Tour			
August 19, 2012	Phish		2012 Summer Tour			
October 17, 2012	Bob Dylan/Mark Knopfler		Bob Dylan Tour with Mark Knopfler 2012			
October 18, 2012	Bob Dylan/Mark Knopfler		Bob Dylan Tour with Mark Knopfler 2012			
February 13, 2013	Swedish House Mafia		One Last Tour			
February 14, 2013	Swedish House Mafia		One Last Tour			
February 15, 2013	Swedish House Mafia		One Last Tour			
February 16, 2013	Swedish House Mafia		One Last Tour			
February 17, 2013	Swedish House Mafia		One Last Tour			
April 27, 2013	The Killers	The Felice Brothers	Battle Born World Tour			
April 28, 2013	The Killers	The Felice Brothers	Battle Born World Tour			
August 2, 2013	Phish		2013 Summer Tour			
August 3, 2013	Phish		2013 Summer Tour			
August 4, 2013	Phish		2013 Summer Tour			
December 7, 2013	Macklemore & Ryan Lewis	Talib Kweli, Big K.R.I.T.	The Heist World Tour			
March 29, 2014	Robin Thicke		Blurred Lines Tour			
April 18, 2014	Lana Del Rey		Paradise Tour			
April 19, 2014	Ellie Goulding	St. Lucia	The Halcyon Days Tour			
October 10, 2014	The Weeknd	ScHoolboy Q, Jhené Aiko	King of the Fall Tour			
October 11, 2014	The Weeknd	ScHoolboy Q, Jhené Aiko	King of the Fall Tour			
October 27, 2014	Phish		2014 Fall Tour			
October 28, 2014	Phish		2014 Fall Tour			
October 29, 2014	Phish		2014 Fall Tour			
September 16, 2015	Zedd		True Colors Tour	17,016 / 17,016	$765,720	
September 17, 2015	Zedd		True Colors Tour	17,016 / 17,016	$765,720	
October 13, 2015	Janet Jackson		Unbreakable World Tour	10,172 / 10,172	$1,131,847	
October 14, 2015	Janet Jackson		Unbreakable World Tour	10,172 / 10,172	$1,131,847	
December 27, 2015	Dead & Company		Dead & Company 2015 Tour	17,032 / 17,032	$1,277,400	
December 28, 2015	Dead & Company		Dead & Company 2015 Tour	17,032 / 17,032	$1,277,400	
March 27, 2016	Fall Out Boy	Finish Ticket, Awolnation	Wintour is Coming	7,300 / 7,300	$385,995	
May 28, 2016	Macklemore & Ryan Lewis		An Evening with Macklemore & Ryan Lewis			
July 18, 2016	Phish		2016 Summer Tour			
July 19, 2016	Phish		2016 Summer Tour			
July 20, 2016	Phish		2016 Summer Tour			
October 21, 2016	Chance the Rapper		Magnificent Coloring World Tour			
April 15, 2017	The xx		I See You Tour			
April 16, 2017	The xx		I See You Tour			
April 17, 2017	The xx		I See You Tour			
May 5, 2017	The Chainsmokers	Kiiara Grandtheft	Memories Do Not Open Tour	17,000 / 17,000	$1,445,000	
May 6, 2017	The Chainsmokers	Kiiara Kyle	Memories Do Not Open Tour	17,000 / 17,000	$1,445,000	
June 17, 2017	Kehlani		SweetSexySavage World Tour			
August 9, 2017	Slayer	Lamb of God, Behemoth		5,833 / 6,500	$301,560	
October 4, 2017	Gorillaz	Vince StaplesDanny Brown	Humanz Tour			
January 22, 2018	St. Vincent		Fear the Future Tour			
February 1, 2018	Queens of the Stone Age	Eagles of Death Metal	Villains World Tour			
May 5, 2018	Khalid	PrettyMuch	Roxy Tour			
May 6, 2018	Khalid	PrettyMuch	Roxy Tour			
July 24, 2018	Phish		2018 Summer Tour			
July 25, 2018	Phish		2018 Summer Tour			
September 7, 2018	Shakira		El Dorado World Tour			
October 20, 2018	Arctic Monkeys	Mini Mansions	Tranquility Base Hotel & Casino Tour			
October 21, 2018	Arctic Monkeys	Mini Mansions	Tranquility Base Hotel & Casino Tour			
November 8, 2018	Brockhampton		I'll Be There Tour			
April 22, 2019	The 1975	Pale Waves	Music for Cars			
May 29, 2019	Billie Eilish	Denzel Curry	When We All Fall Asleep Tour			
June 28, 2019	Carly Rae Jepsen	Mansionair	The Dedicated Tour			
July 25, 2019	Robyn	Troye Sivan	Honey Tour	5,620 / 5,620	$446,811	
October 27, 2019	Lizzo	Empress Of	Cuz I Love You Too Tour			
October 28, 2019	Lizzo	Empress Of	Cuz I Love You Too Tour			
November 11, 2021	Playboi Carti		King Vamp Tour			
May 3, 2022	Lorde	Remi Wolf	Solar Power Tour			
May 27, 2022	Olivia Rodrigo	Chappell Roan	Sour Tour			
October 4, 2022	Rosalía		Motomami World Tour			
October 23, 2022	Lil Nas X		Long Live Montero Tour			
August 4, 2023	(G)I-dle		I Am Free-ty World Tour			
June 6, 2023	Melanie Martinez		PORTALS Tour			
October 29, 2023	Kim Petras		Feed the Beast World Tour			
November 23, 2024	Aurora	Biig Piig	What Happened to the Earth?			
April 22, 2025	Phish		2025 Spring Tour			
April 23, 2025	Phish		2025 Spring Tour			
June 17, 2025	BINI		Biniverse World Tour 2025			
April 7, 2026	FKA Twigs	Eartheater	Body High Tour			
December 17, 2026	Victoria Monet		Frequency of Love Tour			

== See also ==
- List of convention centers in the United States
- List of tennis stadiums by capacity

Events and tenants
Preceded by Cow Palace	Home of the San Francisco Warriors (with War Memorial Gymnasium); 1964–1966	Succeeded by Cow Palace
Preceded by Mission Hills CC; Rancho Mirage	Davis Cup; Final Venue; 1979	Succeeded by Malá Sportovní Hala; Prague
