= My Bad =

My Bad may refer to:

- "My Bad" (song), a 2019 song by Khalid
- "My Bad" (Dexter), an episode of the TV series Dexter
- "My Bad" (Scrubs), an episode of the TV series Scrubs
- My Bad, an album by Rayvon
