= Free Spirit (Khalid album) =

Studio album by Khalid
- Released: April 5, 2019
- Recorded: 2018–2019
- Genre: R&B; pop
- Length: 57:13
- Label: RCA
- Producer: Digi; Charlie Handsome; John Hill; Scribz Riley; Stargate; Al Shux; Kurtis McKenzie; D'Mile; Disclosure; Murda Beatz; John Mayer; Hit-Boy; The Haxan Cloak; Dave Cerminara

Khalid chronology
Suncity (2018)	Free Spirit (2019)	Scenic Drive (2021)

Singles from Free Spirit
- 1. "Talk" Released: February 7, 2019; 2. "Right Back" Released: August 2, 2019

Free Spirit is the second studio album by American singer Khalid, released on April 5, 2019, through RCA Records. It is a follow-up to his 2017 and 2018 releases American Teen (2017) and Suncity (2018). and includes the single "Talk". Khalid also announced a short film directed by Emil Nava to accompany the album, which was released on April 3. The album debuted at number one on the US Billboard 200 and received mixed reviews from music critics.

== Background ==
Khalid announced the title on social media on February 28. He had previously shown the van pictured on the cover in various posts.

== Short film ==
A short film accompanying the album was released on Khalid's YouTube channel on the same day of the album's release.

== Singles ==
"Talk" was released on February 7, 2019, as the album's lead single. "Right Back" featuring A Boogie wit da Hoodie was released on August 2 as the album's second single.

=== Promotional singles ===
On March 7, "My Bad" was released with the album pre-order as a promotional single. "Self" was released on March 29, 2019. On April 3, "Don't Pretend", featuring Safe, was released with the launch of Free Spirit Radio on Beats 1.

=== Other songs ===
The album also includes the singles "Better" and "Saturday Nights" from Khalid's 2018 EP Suncity.

== Critical reception ==
Professional ratings
Aggregate scores
Source	Rating
AnyDecentMusic?	5.2/10
Metacritic	58/100
Review scores
Source	Rating
AllMusic	2.5/5 stars
Entertainment Weekly	C+
The Guardian	2/5 stars
The Independent	3/5 stars
NME	2/5 stars
The Observer	3/5 stars
Pitchfork	4.7/10
Rolling Stone	3/5 stars
The Times	2/5 stars
Vice (Expert Witness)	A−

Free Spirit was met with mixed reviews. At Metacritic, which assigns a normalized rating out of 100 to reviews from mainstream critics, the album has an average score of 58, based on 15 reviews.

Reviewing for The Guardian, Alexis Petridis found the album less original than Khalid's previous work, with the singer having little new to add to the theme of anxiety explored in other "fretfully self-examining R&B", instead showing "a tendency to fall back on cliche". With regards to its musical aspect, the critic complained of a lengthy, "somnambulant pace", but observed some "great pop songs", like "Alive" and "My Bad".

More positive was Robert Christgau, who wrote in his column for Vice that while Khalid's new "privileges and woes" may be foreign to most listeners, he "retains the gift of expressing his feelings in songs that cut star-time inevitabilities down to human scale", observing truisms in lyrics such as "Couldn't have known it would ever be this hard", "I didn't text you because I was workin'", and "If the love feels good it'll work out". Christgau also pointed out that "because Khalid now enjoys access to pricier musical materials than when he was in high school, the hooks pack more texture than tune, making this the rare album that comes fully into its own when you up the volume."

== Commercial performance ==
Free Spirit debuted atop the US Billboard 200 with 202,000 album-equivalent units (including 85,000 pure album sales) in its first week. It is Khalid's first US number-one album.

== Track listing ==
No.	Title	Writer(s)	Producer(s)	Length
1.	"Intro"	Khalid Robinson; Jamil Chammas	Digi; Denis Kosiak^{[v]}	3:32
2.	"Bad Luck"	Robinson; Alexander Shuckburgh; Kurtis McKenzie; Mike Riley	Al Shux; McKenzie; Scribz Riley; Kosiak^{[v]}	3:51
3.	"My Bad"	Robinson; Dernst Emile II	D'Mile	2:43
4.	"Better"	Robinson; Mikkel Storleer Eriksen; Tor Erik Hermansen; Ryan Vojtesak; Chammas; Kosiak	Stargate; Charlie Handsome; Digi; Kosiak^{[a]}	3:49
5.	"Talk" (featuring Disclosure)	Robinson; Howard Lawrence; Guy Lawrence	Disclosure; Kosiak^{[v]}	3:17
6.	"Right Back"	Robinson; Eriksen; Hermansen; Kosiak; Riley; Chammas; Vojtesak; Japhe Tejeda; Jolyon Skinner; Joseph Thomas; Michele Williams; Rodney Jerkins; Brenda Russell	Stargate; Riley; Digi; Charlie Handsome; Kosiak^{[a]}^{[v]}	3:35
7.	"Don't Pretend" (with Safe)	Robinson; Shane Lindstrom; Vojtesak; Mustafa Ahmed; Saif Musaad; Kameron Glasper	Murda Beatz; Charlie Handsome; Kosiak^{[v]}	2:45
8.	"Paradise"	Robinson; John Hill; Sarah Aarons; Dacoury Natche	Hill; DJ Dahi; Kosiak^{[a]}^{[v]}	2:54
9.	"Hundred"	Robinson; Ari Leff; Hill; Chammas; Jordan Palmer; Vojtesak	Hill; Digi; Charlie Handsome; Kosiak^{[v]}	4:37
10.	"Outta My Head" (with John Mayer)	Robinson; John Mayer; Hill; Chammas; Aarons	Hill; Digi; Mayer; Kosiak^{[v]}	2:57
11.	"Free Spirit"	Robinson; Chammas; Aarons; Vojtesak; Justin Scott Lucas	Digi; Charlie Handsome; Kosiak^{[v]}	3:02
12.	"Twenty One"	Robinson; Chammas; Vojtesak; Emily Warren	Charlie Handsome; Digi; Kosiak^{[v]}	3:04
13.	"Bluffin'"	Robinson; Chammas; Vojtesak; Aarons	Digi; Charlie Handsome; Kosiak^{[v]}	3:19
14.	"Self"	Robinson; Samuel Romans; Chauncey Hollis	Hit-Boy	3:49
15.	"Alive"	Robinson; Warren; Hill; John Blanda; Jonathan Hoskins	Hill; Blanda^{[a]}; Hoskins^{[a]}; Kosiak^{[v]}	2:51
16.	"Heaven"	Robinson; Mike Hall	The Haxan Cloak; Dave Cerminara; Kosiak^{[v]}; Josh Tillman^{[v]}	3:33
17.	"Saturday Nights"	Robinson; Vojtesak; Chammas	Charlie Handsome; Digi; Kosiak^{[v]}	3:29
Total length:				57:13

Japanese edition bonus track
No.	Title	Writer(s)	Producer(s)	Length
18.	"Saturday Nights" (with Kane Brown)	Robinson; Vojtesak; Chammas	Charlie Handsome; Digi	3:29
Total length:				60:42

=== Notes ===
- ^{^[a]} indicates an additional producer
- ^{^[v]} indicates a vocal producer

== Personnel ==
Credits adapted from Tidal.

=== Musicians ===
- Khalid – lead vocals
- Al Shux – bass, guitar (track 2)
- D'Mile – bass, piano, programming, synthesizer (3)
- Christina Chow – vocals (4)
- John Hill – guitar, programming (8–10, 15); bass (8, 9, 15), keyboards (8, 10, 15), drums (9)
- DJ Dahi – keyboards, programming (8)
- Ray Suen – guitar (8)
- Digi – keyboards, programming (9, 10); bass (10)
- John Mayer – guitar (10)
- Charlie Handsome – guitar (11)
- Justin Lucas – guitar (11)
- Blanda – keyboards, programming (15)
- Hoskins – keyboards, programming (15)

=== Technical ===
- Denis Kosiak – mixing, recording
- Jon Castelli – mixing
- Guy Lawrence – mixing (5)
- Dale Becker – mastering (1–16)
- Colin Leonard – mastering (17)
- Ingmar Carlson – engineering
- Josh Deguzman – engineering
- Michael Romero – engineering (1–3, 6–16), engineering assistance (4, 5, 17)
- John Kercy – engineering (5)
- Al Shux – recording (2)
- Mikkel Storleer Eriksen – recording (6)
- Tor Erik Hermansen – recording (6)
- Jenna Felsenthal – recording (7)
- Blake Mares – recording (8–10, 15)
- John Hill – recording (8–10, 15)
- Rob Cohen – recording (8–10, 15)
- DJ Dahi – recording (8)
- Chad Franscoviak – recording (10)
- Dave Cerminara – recording (16)
- Tim McClain – engineering assistance (4, 6)
- Alex Layne – engineering assistance (4, 17)
- John Costello – engineering assistance (10, 11)

=== Visuals ===
- Emil Nava – creative direction
- Erwin Gorostiza – creative direction
- Gianna Lee – art direction
- Chloe Hughes – artwork
- Rochel Treliving – artwork
- Grace Pickering – photography

== Charts ==
=== Weekly charts ===
Chart (2019)	Peak position
Australian Albums (ARIA)	2
Austrian Albums (Ö3 Austria)	25
Belgian Albums (Ultratop Flanders)	27
Belgian Albums (Ultratop Wallonia)	97
Canadian Albums (Billboard)	1
Danish Albums (Hitlisten)	4
Dutch Albums (Album Top 100)	3
Finnish Albums (Suomen virallinen lista)	7
French Albums (SNEP)	42
German Albums (Offizielle Top 100)	32
Irish Albums (IRMA)	2
Italian Albums (FIMI)	62
Latvian Albums (LAIPA)	4
Lithuanian Albums (AGATA)	2
New Zealand Albums (RMNZ)	2
Norwegian Albums (VG-lista)	3
Portuguese Albums (AFP)	40
Scottish Albums (OCC)	34
South Korean Albums (Gaon)	56
Spanish Albums (Promusicae)	86
Swedish Albums (Sverigetopplistan)	3
Swiss Albums (Schweizer Hitparade)	8
UK Albums (OCC)	2
US Billboard 200	1
US Top R&B/Hip-Hop Albums (Billboard)	1

=== Year-end charts ===
Chart (2019)	Position
Australian Albums (ARIA)	15
Belgian Albums (Ultratop Flanders)	200
Canadian Albums (Billboard)	9
Danish Albums (Hitlisten)	46
Dutch Albums (Album Top 100)	40
Irish Albums (IRMA)	26
New Zealand Albums (RMNZ)	8
Swedish Albums (Sverigetopplistan)	81
UK Albums (OCC)	63
US Billboard 200	13
US Top R&B/Hip-Hop Albums (Billboard)	7
Chart (2020)	Position
Australian Albums (ARIA)	49
New Zealand Albums (RMNZ)	31
US Billboard 200	55
US Top R&B/Hip-Hop Albums (Billboard)	37
Chart (2021)	Position
US Billboard 200	109

=== Decade-end charts ===
Chart (2010–2019)	Position
US Billboard 200	82

== Certifications ==
Region	Certification	Certified units/sales
Australia (ARIA)	Platinum	70,000^{‡}
Brazil (Pro-Música Brasil)	2× Platinum	80,000^{‡}
Canada (Music Canada)	3× Platinum	240,000^{‡}
Denmark (IFPI Danmark)	Platinum	20,000^{‡}
Mexico (AMPROFON)	Platinum	60,000^{‡}
Netherlands (NVPI)	Gold	20,000^{‡}
New Zealand (RMNZ)	4× Platinum	60,000^{‡}
Norway (IFPI Norway)	Platinum	20,000^{‡}
Singapore (RIAS)	Platinum	10,000^{*}
Switzerland (IFPI Switzerland)	Gold	10,000^{‡}
United Kingdom (BPI)	Gold	100,000^{‡}
United States (RIAA)	2× Platinum	2,000,000^{‡}
^{*} Sales figures based on certification alone.^{‡} Sales+streaming figures based on certification alone.
