= Kaiit =

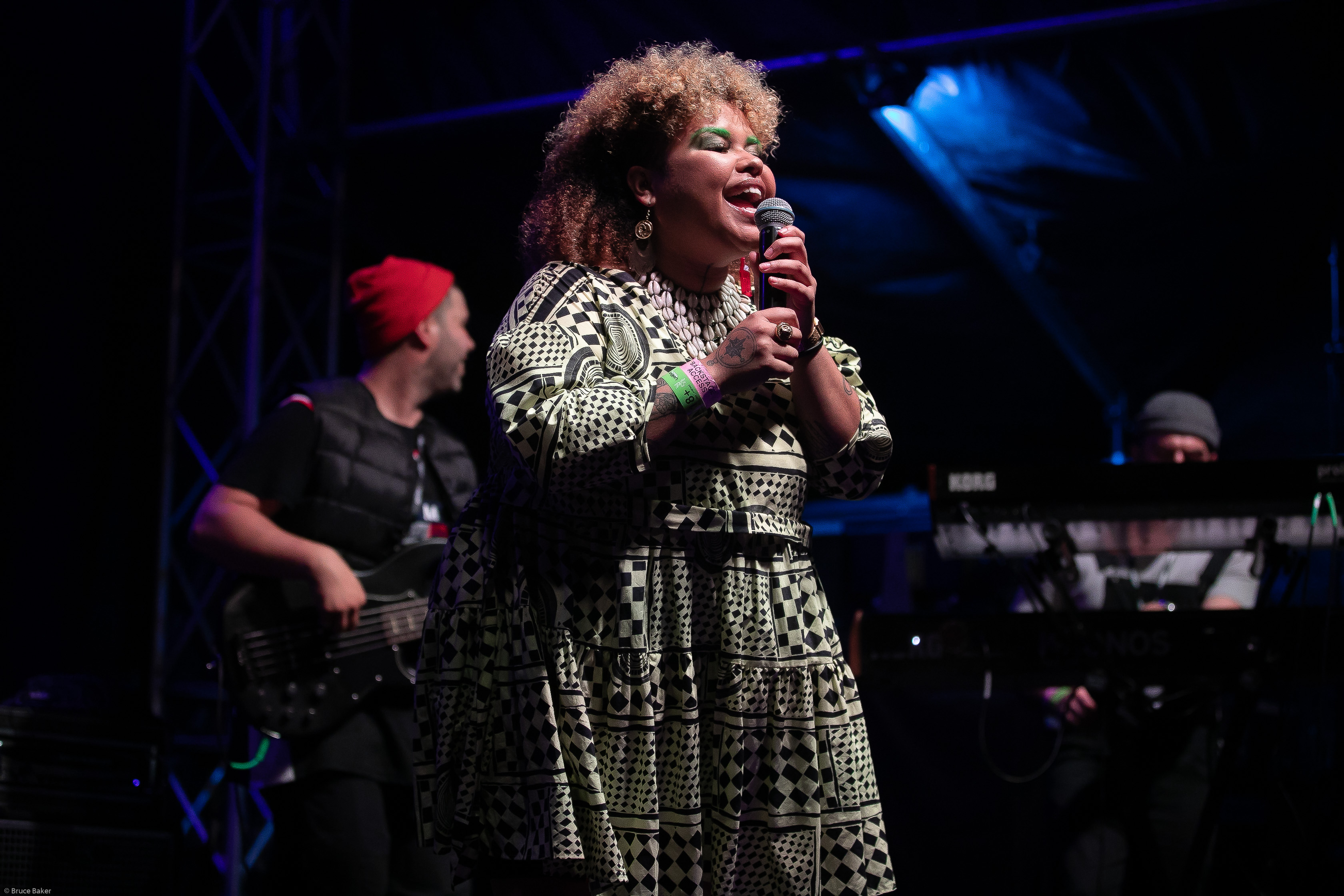
- Kaiit performing at Laneway 2020

Background information
- Born: Kaiit Bellamia Waup; 29 October 1997 (age 28); Papua New Guinea
- Origin: Melbourne, Australia
- Genre: Neo soul
- Occupation: Singer

Kaiit (/ˌkɑːˈiːt/ kah-EET) is the performance name of Kaiit Bellamia Waup (born 29 October 1997, Papua New Guinea), who is a neo soul singer-songwriter based in Australia. At the ARIA Music Awards of 2019, they won the inaugural Best Soul/R&B Release category for the single, "Miss Shiney" (2019).

== Biography ==
Kaiit was born as Kaiit Bellamia Waup, in 1997 in Papua New Guinea (PNG) to a Papua New Guinean father and Indigenous Australian mother of Gunditjmara and Torres Strait Islander heritage. The artist grew up in both PNG and Australia. Initially pursuing a career as a make-up artist, Kaiit turned to performing as a singer based in Melbourne.

Kaiit's first single, "Natural Woman", was issued in mid-2017. It is co-written by Kaiit with Michael Chan, Jack Hewitt, Michael Cooper and Mohamed Komba. Sonny Thomas of Purple Sneakers praised the song, "Jam-packed with soul and seemingly effortless cool, she shines on her new single and film clip." It is included on their five-track debut extended play, Live from Her Room, which was issued in September 2018. Gloria Brancatisano of Beat rated it at 8.5 out-of 10, "Kaiit paints a picture of a woman who understands her worth, appreciating those who come into her life to improve it while carefully removing those who are toxic."

Another single, "OG Luv Kush Pt 2", from the EP had been issued in 2018, which is "an essay of reasons to leave a relationship and in spite of the listed problems, Kaiit shows her strength in character." The track was shared on social media by American singer, Jill Scott. At the APRA Music Awards of 2019 "OG Luv Kush Pt 2" was short-listed for Song of the Year. In that year the singer-songwriter undertook a European tour including a performance at England's The Great Escape Festival. In May 2019 the single, "Miss Shiney", was released. It won the inaugural Best Soul/R&B Release category at the ARIA Music Awards of 2019.

Due to the COVID-19 pandemic in Australia, the artist turned to crowdfunding to maintain their independence from major record labels. In August 2021 they launched a GoFundMe page to "recover [her] independence as an artist" and continue releasing new music. They performed new material in February 2023 at Nocturnal x Midsumma held at Melbourne Museum. In March 2024 the singer supported Zambian-born Sampa the Great at Supreme Court Gardens, Melbourne. Kaiit performed new songs, "2000 n Somethin'" and "Dumb Sis Juice", by "Combining fluid jazz sounds with wavy, celestial vocals, Kaiit delivered a quirky, intimate performance that left listeners feeling giddy and euphoric."

Kaiit's debut studio album And Off She Goes is scheduled for released in May 2025.

== Personal life ==
Kaiit is non-binary, and uses she/her, he/him, and they/them pronouns. Their partner in life is fellow singer Adrian Eagle, who was also nominated for Best Soul/R&B Release in 2019 for his single "AOK".

== Discography ==
=== Albums ===
List of albums released, with selected details about release date and label
Title	Details
And Off She Goes	Released: 16 May 2025; Label: Big Sis Energy Records; Formats: digital download, streaming

=== Extended plays ===
List of extended plays released, with selected details about release date and label
Title	Details
Live from Her Room	Released: 14 September 2018; Label: Alt Music Group; Formats: digital download, streaming

=== Singles ===
List of singles as lead artist
Title	Year	Album
"Natural Woman"	2017	Live from Her Room
"2000 N Somethin"	2017	non-album single
"OG Luv Kush p2"	2018	Live from Her Room
"Miss Shiney"	2019	to be confirmed
"Space"	2024	And Off She Goes
"Lil Mama Theme Song"	2024	And Off She Goes
"Lemon Squeezy"	2026	to be confirmed

==== As featured artist ====
List of singles as featured artist
Title	Year	Album
"Warning" (with Cookin' on 3 Burners)	2018	Lab Experiments Vol. 2

== Awards and nominations ==
=== APRA Awards ===
The APRA Awards are presented annually from 1982 by the Australasian Performing Right Association (APRA), "honouring composers and songwriters".

Year	Nominee / work	Award	Result	Ref.
2019	"OG Luv Kush Pt 2" by Kaiit (Kaiit Waup, Michael Chan, Anthony Douglas, Mohamed Komba, Jaydean Miranda, Damian Smith)	Song of the Year	Shortlisted	
2020	"Miss Shiney" by Kaiit (Kaiit Waup, Vincent Goodyer, Nicholas Martin)	Song of the Year	Shortlisted	
2025	"Space" by Kaiit (Kaiit Waup, Jake Amy, Anthony Liddell, Jaydean Miranda, Justin Smith)	Most Performed R&B / Soul Work	Won	

=== ARIA Music Awards ===
The ARIA Music Awards is an annual awards ceremony that recognises excellence, innovation, and achievement across all genres of Australian music.

Year	Nominee / work	Award	Result
2019	"Miss Shiney"	Best Soul/R&B Release	Won

=== Music Victoria Awards ===
The Music Victoria Awards, are an annual awards night celebrating Victorian music. They commenced in 2005.

Year	Nominee / work	Award	Result	Ref.
2018	herself	Best Hip Hop Act	Nominated	
2018	herself	Breakthrough Act	Nominated	
2018	herself	Archie Roach Award for Emerging Talent	Won	
2019	herself	Best Hip Hop Act	Nominated	
2024	"Space"	Best Song or Track	Nominated	

=== Vanda & Young Global Songwriting Competition ===
The Vanda & Young Global Songwriting Competition is an annual competition that "acknowledges great songwriting whilst supporting and raising money for Nordoff-Robbins" and is coordinated by Albert Music and APRA AMCOS. It commenced in 2009.

Year	Nominee / work	Award	Result
2019	"Miss Shiney"	Unpublished prize	Won
