= Right Back (song) =

Single by Khalid featuring A Boogie wit da Hoodie

from the album Free Spirit
- Released: August 2, 2019
- Length: 4:15
- Label: RCA
- Songwriters: Khalid Robinson; Mikkel S. Eriksen; Tor Erik Hermansen; Denis Kosiak; Jamil Chammas; Ryan Vojtesak; Scribz Riley; Japhe Tejeda; Jolyon Skinner; Joseph Thomas; Michele Williams; Rodney Jerkins
- Producers: Stargate; Denis Kosiak; Scribz Riley; Digi; Charlie Handsome

Khalid singles chronology
"Caught Up" (2019)	"Right Back" (2019)	"Hurts 2B Human" (2019)

A Boogie wit da Hoodie singles chronology
"Big Rich Town" (2019)	"Right Back" (2019)	"SZNS" (2019)

Music video
- "Right Back" on YouTube

"Right Back" is a song by American singer Khalid from his second studio album Free Spirit (2019). It was originally recorded as a solo version and charted as an album track in April before being released as a single featuring American rapper A Boogie wit da Hoodie on August 2.

== Critical reception ==
Alex Zidel of HotNewHipHop said the song "already sounded complete but Khalid had a thought: What if we add A Boogie wit da Hoodie to this? That would make it a hit, right? It turns out that he was correct."

== Track listing ==
- Single version
1. "Right Back" (featuring A Boogie wit da Hoodie) – 4:15
- Album version
1. "Right Back" – 3:35

== Charts ==
=== Album version ===
Chart (2019)	Peak position
Australia (ARIA)	41
New Zealand (Recorded Music NZ)	37
US Rolling Stone Top 100	56

=== Remix version ===
==== Weekly charts ====
Chart (2019)	Peak position
Canada Hot 100 (Billboard)	58
Ireland (IRMA)	53
Lithuania (AGATA)	51
New Zealand Hot Singles (RMNZ)	5
UK Singles (OCC)	71
US Billboard Hot 100	73
US Hot R&B/Hip-Hop Songs (Billboard)	29
US Pop Airplay (Billboard)	40
US Rhythmic Airplay (Billboard)	9

==== Year-end charts ====
Chart (2019)	Position
US Rhythmic (Billboard)	50

== Certifications ==
Region	Certification	Certified units/sales
Australia (ARIA)	Gold	35,000^{‡}
Canada (Music Canada)	2× Platinum	160,000^{‡}
New Zealand (RMNZ) Solo version	Platinum	30,000^{‡}
United States (RIAA)	Platinum	1,000,000^{‡}
^{‡} Sales+streaming figures based on certification alone.

== Release history ==
Region	Date	Format	Version	Label	Ref.
Various	August 2, 2019	Digital download; streaming	Remix	RCA	
United States	August 27, 2019	Top 40 radio	Remix	RCA	
