= Bob Dylan Tour with Mark Knopfler 2012 =

2012 concert tour by Bob Dylan and Mark Knopfler

Bob Dylan Tour with Mark Knopfler
- North American tour by Mark Knopfler
- Location: North America
- Associated album: Privateering
- Start date: 5 October 2012
- End date: 21 November 2012
- Legs: 1
- No. of shows: 33

Mark Knopfler concert chronology
- Bob Dylan Tour with Mark Knopfler (2011); Bob Dylan Tour with Mark Knopfler (2012); Privateering Tour (2013)

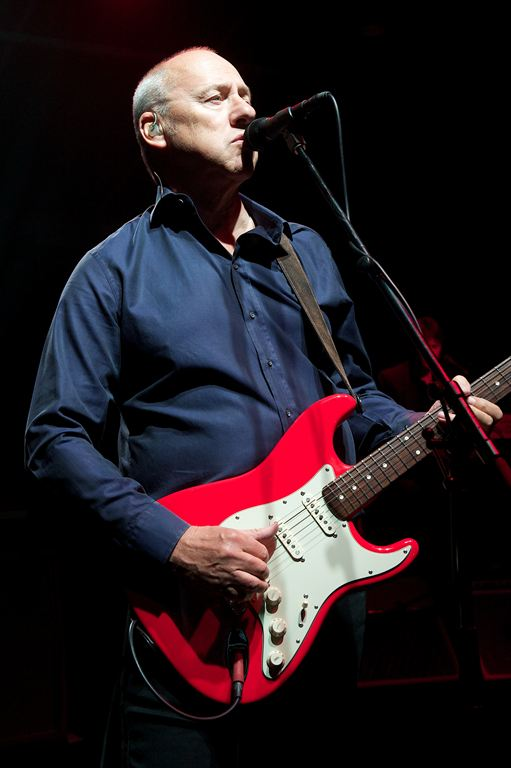
Mark Knopfler live in concert in 2012.

The Bob Dylan Tour with Mark Knopfler 2012 was a concert tour by American singer-songwriter Bob Dylan and British singer-songwriter and guitarist Mark Knopfler. The North American tour, which was part of Dylan's Never Ending Tour 2012, started on 5 October 2012 in Winnipeg, Manitoba, and included 33 concerts in 31 cities, ending in Brooklyn, New York, on 21 November 2012.

== Description ==
The concerts typically consisted of Knopfler and his band performing an eleven-song opening set, followed by Dylan and his band performing a fourteen-song set, with Knopfler accompanying Dylan on guitar for the first four songs.

Knopfler used the opportunity of the tour to promote the release of his album Privateering, which was released on 3 September 2012. Setlists from this tour included a number of new songs from the album, such as "Redbud Tree", "Haul Away", "Privateering", "Miss You Blues", "Corned Beef City", "Yon Two Crows", and "I Used to Could". (Note: Knopfler's official Privateering Tour of Europe is scheduled to start on 25 April 2013 in Bucharest, Romania and will include 67 concerts in 66 cities, ending on 30 July 2013 in San Sebastian, Spain.)

Knopfler's tour lineup included Mark Knopfler (guitar, vocals), Richard Bennett (guitar), Guy Fletcher (keyboards), Jim Cox (piano, organ, accordion), Michael McGoldrick (whistles, uilleann pipes), John McCusker (violin, cittern), Glenn Worf (bass), and Ian Thomas (drums).

== Critical response ==
Knopfler and his band received positive reviews for their sets during the tour. In his review for UT San Diego, George Varga praised Knopfler for "delivering a remarkably tasteful set". Commenting on Knopfler's accompanying Dylan on "Summer Days", Varga noted:

Knopfler was notably deferential, adding a few Les Paul-inspired guitar filigrees, but clearly holding back, lest he detract from the star of the show. As a result, the song simmered nicely, without ever hitting a full boil.

In his review for the Los Angeles Times, Randall Roberts praised Knopfler and his band for offered a "beautiful set". Roberts noted that Knopfler's guitar tone is "an exquisite, instantly recognizable creation".

In his review for the Vancouver Sun, Francois Marchand praised Knopfler and his band for their performance.

The legendary axe man's guitar skills were as impeccable as ever, and he wove his way through a dozen songs with inimitable style and a disconcerting ease. Backed by an ace seven-piece band, Knopfler opened with What It Is, his classic guitar tone instantly recognizable as it echoed throughout the room. The stage looked like a museum of vintage amps, each one cooler than the next. Knopfler was electrifying even when he was unplugged, getting a mighty roar after the bagpipe-laden Privateering, ... followed by a measured, lap steel-tinged Redbud Tree, again with that classic Stratocaster tone coming out of those Marshall amps, Knopfler's fingers perhaps speaking more eloquently than the 63-year-old's voice. Knopfler was calm and collected, laying into his folky and bluesy grooves slow and steady—the stripped down guitar, drums and standup bass combo on Song for Sonny Liston, the shuffle and stomp of Marbletown, ending in an extended Celtic flute-and-fiddle jam—and it all sounded excellent thanks to expert hands on the board at the back of the room.

In his review for Gig City, Wayne Arthurson was equally impressed with Knopfler and his band, noting it was probably the first time "the entire crowd were in their seats to catch an opening act." Athurson described Knopfler as "cool, collected, one of the greatest guitarists in living memory."

== Tour dates ==
Date	City	Country	Venue	Setlist
North America
5 October 2012	Winnipeg	Canada	MTS Centre	1
6 October 2012	Regina	Canada	Brandt Centre	2
8 October 2012	Saskatoon	Canada	Credit Union Centre	3
9 October 2012	Edmonton	Canada	Rexall Place	1
10 October 2012	Calgary	Canada	Scotiabank Saddledome	4
12 October 2012	Vancouver	Canada	Rogers Arena	5
13 October 2012	Seattle	United States	KeyArena	4
15 October 2012	Portland	United States	Rose Garden Arena	6
17 October 2012	San Francisco	United States	Bill Graham Civic Auditorium	6
18 October 2012	San Francisco	United States	Bill Graham Civic Auditorium	7
19 October 2012	Berkeley	United States	Greek Theatre	6
20 October 2012	Sacramento	United States	Power Balance Pavilion	8
22 October 2012	Santa Barbara	United States	Santa Barbara City Bowl	9
24 October 2012	San Diego	United States	Valley View Casino Center	10
26 October 2012	Los Angeles	United States	Hollywood Bowl	10
27 October 2012	Las Vegas	United States	Mandalay Bay Events Center	7
29 October 2012	Broomfield	United States	1st Bank Center	11
30 October 2012	Broomfield	United States	1st Bank Center	10
1 November 2012	Grand Prairie	United States	Verizon Theatre	12
2 November 2012	Tulsa	United States	BOK Center	11
3 November 2012	Omaha	United States	CenturyLink Center	12
5 November 2012	Madison	United States	Alliant Energy Center	13
7 November 2012	Saint Paul	United States	Xcel Energy Center	12
8 November 2012	Milwaukee	United States	BMO Harris Bradley Center	13
9 November 2012	Chicago	United States	United Center	10
12 November 2012	Grand Rapids	United States	Van Andel Arena	12
13 November 2012	Detroit	United States	Fox Theatre	7
14 November 2012	Toronto	Canada	Air Canada Centre	10
16 November 2012	Montreal	Canada	Bell Centre	10
18 November 2012	Boston	United States	TD Garden	10
19 November 2012	Philadelphia	United States	Wells Fargo Center	10
20 November 2012	Washington, D.C.	United States	Verizon Center	10
21 November 2012	New York City	United States	Barclay's Center	13

== Setlists ==
For Dylan's setlists, see Never Ending Tour 2012.

- Setlist 1 – What It Is, Corned Beef City, Yon Two Crows, Privateering, Redbud Tree, I Used to Could, Song for Sonny Liston, Daddy's Gone to Knoxville, Hill Farmer's Blues, Haul Away, Miss You Blues, Marbletown, So Far Away
- Setlist 2 – What It Is, Cleaning My Gun, Sailing to Philadelphia, Privateering, Redbud Tree, I Used to Could, Song for Sonny Liston, Done with Bonaparte, I'm the Fool, Haul Away, Miss You Blues, Marbletown, So Far Away
- Setlist 3 – What It Is, Corned Beef City, Yon Two Crows, Privateering, Redbud Tree, I Used to Could, Haul Away, Song for Sonny Liston, Done with Bonaparte, Hill Farmer's Blues, Marbletown, So Far Away
- Setlist 4 – What It Is, Cleaning My Gun, Privateering, Yon Two Crows, I Used to Could, Song for Sonny Liston, Daddy's Gone to Knoxville, Hill Farmer's Blues, Miss You Blues, Marbletown, So Far Away
- Setlist 5 – What It Is, Corned Beef City, Privateering, Yon Two Crows, Redbud Tree, I Used to Could, Song for Sonny Liston, Done with Bonaparte, Hill Farmer's Blues, Haul Away, Marbletown, So Far Away
- Setlist 6 – What It Is, Corned Beef City, Privateering, Yon Two Crows, I Used to Could, Song for Sonny Liston, Done with Bonaparte, Hill Farmer's Blues, Haul Away, Marbletown, So Far Away
- Setlist 7 – What It Is, Corned Beef City, Privateering, Kingdom of Gold, I Used to Could, Song for Sonny Liston, Daddy's Gone to Knoxville, Hill Farmer's Blues, Haul Away, Marbletown, So Far Away
- Setlist 8 – What It Is, Corned Beef City, Privateering, Yon Two Crows, I Used to Could, Song for Sonny Liston, Done with Bonaparte, A Night in Summer Long Ago, Hill Farmer's Blues, Marbletown, So Far Away
- Setlist 9 – What It Is, Corned Beef City, Privateering, Yon Two Crows, I Used to Could, Song for Sonny Liston, Haul Away, Hill Farmer's Blues, Marbletown, So Far Away
- Setlist 10 – What It Is, Corned Beef City, Privateering, Kingdom of Gold, I Used to Could, Song for Sonny Liston, Done with Bonaparte, Hill Farmer's Blues, Haul Away, Marbletown, So Far Away
- Setlist 11 – What It Is, Corned Beef City, Privateering, Yon Two Crows, I Used to Could, Song for Sonny Liston, Done with Bonaparte, Hill Farmer's Blues, Brothers in Arms, Marbletown, So Far Away
- Setlist 12 – What It Is, Corned Beef City, Privateering, Kingdom of Gold, I Used to Could, Song for Sonny Liston, Done with Bonaparte, Hill Farmer's Blues, Brothers in Arms, Marbletown, So Far Away
- Setlist 13 – What It Is, Corned Beef City, Privateering, Kingdom of Gold, I Used to Could, Song for Sonny Liston, Done with Bonaparte, Hill Farmer's Blues, Marbletown, So Far Away

== See also ==
- Never Ending Tour 2012
