= Space (Kaiit song) =

Single by Kaiit

from the album And Off She Goes
- Released: 29 April 2024
- Length: 3:27
- Label: Big Sis Energy
- Songwriter(s): Kaiit Bellamia Waup Anthony Liddell, Justin Smith
- Producer(s): Kaiit, Anthony Liddell

Kaiit singles chronology
"Miss Shiney" (2019)	"Space" (2024)	"Lil Mama Theme Song" (2024)

Music video
- "Space" on YouTube

"Space" is a song made by Australian recording artist Kaiit. The song was released on 29 April 2024.

At the 2024 Music Victoria Awards, the song was nominated for Best Song or Track.

At the APRA Music Awards of 2025, the song won the Most Performed R&B / Soul Work.

== Reception ==
Sarah Downs from Brag Media said "'Space' showcases Kaiit's soulful vocals and introspective lyrics, offering listeners a moment of contemplation before action."

Laura McInnes from Sniffers said "With her serene, soothing neo-soul melodies dazzling over a down tempo percussive groove and slinky guitar chords, Kaiit sings of a spiritual sanctuary of protected energy with her tranquil tone offering mellow lyrical meditations."
