= Suncity =

2018 EP by Khalid

EP by Khalid
- Released: October 19, 2018
- Recorded: September 2018
- Genre: R&B
- Length: 21:09
- Label: RCA
- Producer: Charlie Handsome; Digi; John Hill; Rogét Chahayed; Stargate; DJDS

Khalid chronology
American Teen (2017)	Suncity (2018)	Free Spirit (2019)

Singles from Suncity
- 1. "Better" Released: September 14, 2018; 2. "Saturday Nights" Released: January 11, 2019

Suncity is the first extended play by American singer Khalid. It was released on October 19, 2018, by RCA Records. It was supported by the single "Better".

The EP debuted at number eight on the US Billboard 200 with 50,000 album-equivalent units.

== Singles ==
The EP was supported by the single "Better", which was released on September 14, 2018. The song went on to reach the top ten in Australia, Belgium, New Zealand and Norway. It peaked at number 8 on the Billboard Hot 100.

A remix of "Saturday Nights" with country singer Kane Brown was released as a single on January 9, 2019. It reached the top 60 in Canada and the US.

== Critical reception ==
Professional ratings
Aggregate scores
Source	Rating
Metacritic	68/100
Review scores
Source	Rating
Exclaim!	8/10
HipHopDX	3.7/5
Pitchfork	6.2/10
Vice (Expert Witness)	(3-star Honorable Mention)

At Metacritic, which assigns a normalised rating out of 100 to reviews from mainstream critics, the album has an average score of 68, based on 4 reviews, indicating "generally favorable reviews".

== Track listing ==
Suncity track listing
No.	Title	Writer(s)	Producer(s)	Length
1.	"9.13"	Khalid Robinson	Charlie Handsome; Digi; Denis Kosiak^{[b]}	0:54
2.	"Vertigo"	Robinson; Sarah Aarons; Rogét Chahayed; Jamil Chammas; John Hill; Ryan Vojtesak	Charlie Handsome; Digi; Hill; Chahayed; Kosiak^{[b]}	4:30
3.	"Saturday Nights"	Robinson; Chammas; Vojtesak	Charlie Handsome; Digi; Kosiak^{[b]}	3:29
4.	"Salem's Interlude"	Robinson	Charlie Handsome; Digi; Kosiak^{[b]}	1:21
5.	"Motion"	Robinson; Chammas; Vojtesak	Charlie Handsome; Digi; Khalid; Kosiak^{[b]}	3:55
6.	"Better"	Robinson; Chammas; Mikkel Storleer Eriksen; Tor Erik Hermansen; Vojtesak	Stargate; Charlie Handsome; Digi; Kosiak^{[a]}	3:49
7.	"Suncity" (featuring Empress Of)	Robinson; Chammas; Sam Griesemer; Jerome Potter; Lorely Rodriguez; Vojtesak	DJDS; Charlie Handsome; Digi	3:09
Total length:				21:09

=== Notes ===
- ^{^[a]} signifies an additional producer
- ^{^[b]} signifies a vocal producer

== Personnel ==
Credits adapted from Tidal.

- Khalid – lead vocals
- Denis Kosiak – mixing (all tracks), recording (tracks 1–6)
- Jon Castelli – mixing
- Colin Leonard – mastering
- Ingmar Carlson – engineering
- Josh Deguzman – engineering
- Alex Layne – engineering assistance
- Michael Romero – engineering assistance
- Dee Margo – background vocals (1)
- Gabe Noel – strings (2)
- Paul Cartwright – strings (2)
- Rob Cohen – recording (2)
- Amber Perryman – background vocals (4)
- Salem Mitchell – background vocals (4)
- Demetrius "Meech" Harmon – background vocals (5)
- Christina Chow – vocals (6)
- Tim McClain – engineering assistance (6)
- Rosalía – background vocals (7)
- DJDS – recording (7)

== Charts ==
=== Weekly charts ===
Chart (2018)	Peak position
Australian Albums (ARIA)	9
Canadian Albums (Billboard)	6
Danish Albums (Hitlisten)	2
Dutch Albums (Album Top 100)	10
Finnish Albums (Suomen virallinen lista)	12
Irish Albums (IRMA)	4
New Zealand Albums (RMNZ)	11
Norwegian Albums (VG-lista)	3
Swedish Albums (Sverigetopplistan)	3
Swiss Albums (Schweizer Hitparade)	63
UK Albums (OCC)	20
US Billboard 200	8
US Top R&B/Hip-Hop Albums (Billboard)	5

=== Year-end charts ===
Chart (2019)	Position
Danish Albums (Hitlisten)	89
Swedish Albums (Sverigetopplistan)	68
US Billboard 200	147
US Top R&B/Hip-Hop Albums (Billboard)	54

== Certifications ==
Region	Certification	Certified units/sales
Canada (Music Canada)	Platinum	80,000^{‡}
Denmark (IFPI Danmark)	Gold	10,000^{‡}
New Zealand (RMNZ)	Gold	7,500^{‡}
United Kingdom (BPI)	Silver	60,000^{‡}
^{‡} Sales+streaming figures based on certification alone.
