= Demetrius Harmon =

American social media personality (born 1998)

Demetrius Harmon (born March 1, 1998), who previously went by the internet name MeechOnMars, is an American internet personality, entrepreneur, activist, and actor. Harmon first gained popularity on Vine, building a mass following, before branching out to other platforms to reach his audience with a more serious tone. This meant that he was doing something different than the comedic short-form videos he was known for. Harmon is the founder of the apparel brand You Matter, and You Matter University.

== Early life ==
Demetrius Harmon was born on March 1, 1998, in Detroit, Michigan. In middle school, Harmon's interest in design and entrepreneurship led him to create a clothing line, which would evolve into the brand he owns today. Upon graduating in 2016, Harmon moved to Los Angeles, California, at 18 years old to pursue his clothing brand and social media career full-time.

== Career ==
=== Social media ===
Harmon's social media career started while he was still in high school. He began posting on YouTube and Vine with a childhood friend in 8th grade, uploading a variety of comedic content. Many of their videos were skits centered around historical events or ideas, and Harmon's most popular video was an Adam and Eve comedic reenactment that went viral. Harmon was known for these comedic short videos and accumulated a large following across multiple social platforms. Harmon shifted his content to include more serious topics, mainly surrounding mental health. Harmon started posting openly about his mental health struggles on Twitter and Instagram, and in 2016, created a short film, Be Happy, about his mental health and emotional state, which he published on YouTube.

After receiving positive reactions to his first piece of more serious content, Harmon continued to share his candid thoughts and took a more vulnerable approach to his content, aiming to connect and offer support to his audience. Harmon then created a documentary called You Matter, featuring his Twitter followers. The documentary discusses Harmon's and his followers' experiences with mental illness and self-harm, to show his audience that everyone, regardless of race or gender, may face similar struggles. Harmon has continued to use his platforms to talk about mental health and advocate for destigmatizing mental illness within his generation, emphasizing the importance within the Black community, and for Black men.

=== You Matter ===
In 2016, after transitioning his content to include the focus on mental health, Harmon founded You Matter, a popular appeal brand. The brand is most known for its signature hoodies with the words "You Matter" across the front, and on the wrists are the words "I feel weak, but I know I'm strong,". The brand was created with the goal of helping individuals feel strong, seen, and promote destigmatizing mental illness.

Harmon then created You Matter University, an addition to his brand and scholarship, which awarded 5 applicants with $10,000 to use towards their education.

=== Public speaking/lectures ===
After launching You Matter, and continuing to post openly on social media about his struggles, Harmon was chosen by the students at Edelson Ford High School to be the 2018 graduation keynote speaker. From there, Harmon was asked by many universities including but not limited to, Iowa State University, George Washington University, University of Utah, Purdue University, University of Connecticut, University of Michigan, University of Maryland, and University of Washington. His appearances included keynote speeches, panels, interviews and webinars talking about his career, mental health, offering advice to students, and discussing the importance of finding your own path.

=== Other ===
Harmon was featured in Khalid's "Young Dumb and Broke" music video which was released on August 1, 2017.
