= UNO Stereo =

Australian music producer, songwriter, and mixing engineer

- Also known as: Nic Martin
- Born: Nicholas Martin
- Origin: Melbourne, Victoria, Australia
- Genres: Hip hop, R&B, pop
- Occupations: Music producer, songwriter, mixing engineer
- Years active: 2012–present

Nic Martin, known professionally as UNO Stereo, is an Australian record producer, songwriter and artist based in Melbourne. He has produced ARIA Music Award winning and APRA Award nominated records.

Martin went from bedroom-beatmaking at age 11 to recording and producing rap records at age 18 with long-time friend and collaborator Blessed (FKA Miracle). He worked his way into the music industry by teaming up with local talent and forming a group then known as Dream Big Music. His career progressed further with platinum-certified records from Timomatic and Justice Crew and producing for Jay Sean and Busta Rhymes, UNO Stereo worked on projects with prominent Australian rappers such as Seth Sentry's album Strange New Past, which won the ARIA Music Award for Best Urban Album, and Bliss n Eso's platinum-certified single "Moments". He has also worked with Illy, Horrorshow, Tuka, Urthboy and Drapht.

Since then, he has gone on to co-produce Khalid's Grammy nominated debut studio album American Teen and 360's comeback album Vintage Modern. He then dropped his own UNO Stereo collaborations, whilst his single "Got U" was streamed over two million times. He produced British artist Wiley's "Over It" and American rapper Wale's "Debbie", dropped a collaborative single with Canada's Maurice Moore ("Just 2"), and produced the ARIA Music Award-winning single "Miss Shiney" for neo soul musician Kaiit.

== Awards and nominations ==
- Won – 2019 ARIA Music Awards for Best Soul/R&B Release (Kaiit's "Miss Shiney")
- Nominated − 2018 Grammy Awards for Best Urban Contemporary Album (Khalid's American Teen)
- Nominated – 2018 APRA Awards for Urban Work of the Year (Bliss n Eso feat. Gavin James' "Moments")
- Won – 2015 ARIA Awards for Best Urban Album (Seth Sentry's Strange New Past)

== Discography ==
=== Solo ===
- Innervisions – Single, 2013
- Got U (feat. Majerle) – Single, 2016
- Just 2 (feat. Maurice Moore) – Single, 2017
- KEEP UP (feat. Mari and Majerle) – Single, 2017
- Episodes, Vol. 1 – Mixtape, 2018
- My Way (feat. Jordan Dennis) – Single, 2018
- Innerludes – EP, 2020
- TEXT (feat. Amindi) – Single, 2020
- A Vibe Called Quest – Single, 2020
- Discourse (feat. 18YOMAN) – Single, 2023
- Passengers (feat. Liyah Knight) – Single, 2023
- IDCT (feat. Billy Maree) – Single, 2023
- Del Boca Vista Pt.2 – Single, 2023

=== Selected production and co-writes ===
| Year | Song | Artist | Album | Label | Co-Writer | Producer | Certifications |
|---|---|---|---|---|---|---|---|
| 2023 | Del Boca Vista Pt. 2 | UNO Stereo | Passengers | Warner Music Australia | check | check | |
| 2023 | IDCT | UNO Stereo, Billy Maree | Passengers | Warner Music Australia | check | check | |
| 2023 | Passengers | UNO Stereo, Liyah Knight | Passengers | Warner Music Australia | check | check | |
| 2023 | Discourse | UNO Stereo, 18YOMAN | Passengers | Warner Music Australia | check | check | |
| 2023 | Reservoir Dogs | Chillinit, Miko Mal | 420DNA | 420 Family | check | check | |
| 2023 | No Peace | Jada Weazel | No Peace (EP) | EMI/ Universal Music Australia | check | check | |
| 2023 | Closer | Jada Weazel | No Peace (EP) | EMI/ Universal Music Australia | check | check | |
| 2023 | Hands Of Addiction | Jada Weazel | No Peace (EP) | EMI/ Universal Music Australia | check | check | |
| 2023 | Inhibitions | Jada Weazel | No Peace (EP) | EMI/ Universal Music Australia | check | check | |
| 2023 | Skin | Jada Weazel | No Peace (EP) | EMI/ Universal Music Australia | check | check | |
| 2023 | LET HER BE | Maina Doe | Let Her Be | Valve Sounds | check | check | |
| 2022 | Naked | CVIRO, GXNXVS | Come On In (EP) | Warner Music Aus | check | check | |
| 2022 | Nasty | CVIRO, GXNXVS, Jean Deaux | Come On In (EP) | Warner Music Aus | check | check | |
| 2022 | In God We Trust | BLESSED | Aussie Blackstar | Warner Music Aus | check | check | |
| 2021 | Tranquilize (REMIX) | Telenova | Tranquilize EP | Pointer Recordings | check | check | |
| 2021 | Ezinna | B Wise, Milan Ring | Jamie | Semi Pro Sound, Sony Music Aus | check | check | |
| 2021 | Black Visionary | B Wise, BLESSED | Jamie | Semi Pro Sound, Sony Music Aus | check | check | |
| 2021 | Heavies | B Wise | Jamie | Semi Pro Sound, Sony Music Aus | check | check | |
| 2021 | Summer Freaks | B Wise, Manu Crooks | Jamie | Semi Pro Sound, Sony Music Aus | check | check | |
| 2021 | U Say | B Wise | Jamie | Semi Pro Sound, Sony Music Aus | check | check | |
| 2021 | BYO | Ojikae | 3033 | Warner Music Aus. | check | check | |
| 2023 | Your Side, MY Side, The Truth | Chillinit | The Octagon | 420 Family | check | check | |
| 2020 | Chance Again | GXNXVS, CVIRO, Kaleem Taylor | The Sequal | Universal Music Aus. | check | check | |
| 2020 | Doubt | Teischa | Doubt | Universal Aus. | check | check | |
| 2020 | TEXT | UNO Stereo, Amindi | TEXT | Warner Music Aus. | check | check | |
| 2020 | Think Twice | B Wise, Kojey Radical | Jamie | Semi Pro Sound, Sony Music Aus. | check | check | |
| 2020 | PLAYIN | UNO Stereo | Innerludes | Warner Music Australia | check | check | |
| 2020 | Vinny's Interlude | UNO Stereo, 18YOMAN | Innerludes | Warner Music Australia | check | check | |
| 2020 | Purple Tape | UNO Stereo | Innerludes | Warner Music Australia | check | check | |
| 2020 | Keynote Interlude | UNO Stereo, Jordan Dennis | Innerludes | Warner Music Australia | check | check | |
| 2020 | On My Mind | UNO Stereo, Majerle | Innerludes | Warner Music Australia | check | check | |
| 2020 | Need 2 Say | UNO Stereo, Ojikae | Innerludes | Warner Music Australia | check | check | |
| 2020 | Bandz | Destructo, Kevin Gates, Yo Gotti, Denzel Curry | Bandz | Parametric Records | check | check | |
| 2019 | Debbie | Wale | Wow... That's Crazy | Warner Records | check | check | |
| 2019 | Miss Shiney | Kaiit | Miss Shiney | Alt. Music Group | check | check | |
| 2019 | Overdue | Ojikae | Overdue | Warner Music Australia | check | check | |
| 2019 | Magic | Ceeko | Magic | Alt. Music Group | check | check | |
| 2019 | EX | Ojikae | EX | Warner Music Australia | check | check | |
| 2018 | Over It | Wiley | Godfather II | CTA | check | check | |
| 2018 | Ready or Not (feat. Bluey Robinson, UNO Stereo) | Midas Hutch | The Feels | Independent | check | check | |
| 2018 | West | Lakyn Heperi | & Pains EP | Universal Music Australia | check | check | |
| 2018 | Slumdog | Lakyn Heperi | & Pains EP | Universal Music Australia | check | check | |
| 2018 | My Way | UNO Stereo, Jordan Dennis | My Way | Independent | check | check | |
| 2018 | The Key | B Wise | Area Famous | Elefant Traks | check | check | |
| 2018 | Flex On | B Wise | Area Famous | Elefant Traks | check | check | |
| 2018 | Sunday Best | B Wise | Area Famous | Elefant Traks | check | check | |
| 2018 | Dive In (UNO Stereo remix) | Olu Bliss | Traveling Bliss | As We Arrive | check | check | |
| 2018 | House in the Hamptons | UNO Stereo | Episodes, Vol. 1 | Independent | check | check | |
| 2018 | Good for You Jack | UNO Stereo | Episodes, Vol. 2 | Independent | check | check | |
| 2018 | Glitterati | UNO Stereo | Episodes, Vol. 3 | Independent | check | check | |
| 2018 | Double Div | UNO Stereo | Episodes, Vol. 4 | Independent | check | check | |
| 2018 | Del Boca Vista | UNO Stereo | Episodes, Vol. 5 | Independent | check | check | |
| 2017 | Cold Blooded | Khalid | American Teen | RCA Records | check | check | |
| 2017 | Just 2 | Maurice Moore & UNO Stereo | Just 2 | Independent | check | check | |
| 2017 | KEEP UP (feat. Mari & Majerle) | UNO Stereo | KEEP UP | Independent | check | check | |
| 2017 | Innervisions | UNO Stereo | Innervisions | Independent | check | check | |
| 2017 | Vintage Modern (all tracks excluding Tiny Angels & Letters) | 360 | Vintage Modern | EMI Music Australia | check | check | |
| 2017 | Just a Thought | 360 | VI | EMI Music Australia | check | check | |
| 2017 | God Mode | 360 | VI | EMI Music Australia | check | check | |
| 2017 | Moments (feat. Gavin James) | Bliss n Eso | Off the Grid | Illusive | check | check | 3 × Platinum |
| 2017 | Fit In | David Dallas | Hood Country Club | Independent | check | check | |
| 2017 | Play It Safe | Seth Sentry | Play It Safe | Independent | check | check | |
| 2016 | wdubi (feat. Nasty Mars, Marcus) | Baro | Just Problems You Need to Know | teamtrick. | check | check | |
| 2016 | Got U | UNO Stereo | Got U | Independent | check | check | |
| 2016 | 40 Days | B Wise | 40 Days | Independent | check | check | |
| 2016 | Say It for Me | Maribelle | Overtake | Warner Music Australia | check | check | |
| 2016 | Petty | Seth Sentry | Petty | Independent | check | check | |
| 2016 | Second Heartbeat | Urthboy | The Past Beats Behind Me Like a Second Heartbeat | Elefant Traks | check | check | |
| 2016 | The Arrow | Urthboy | The Past Beats Behind Me Like a Second Heartbeat | Elefant Traks | check | check | |
| 2015 | Run | Seth Sentry | Strange New Past | Independent | check | check | |
| 2015 | Nobody Like Me | Seth Sentry | Strange New Past | Independent | check | check | |
| 2015 | Hell Boy | Seth Sentry | Strange New Past | Independent | check | check | |
| 2015 | Violin | Seth Sentry | Strange New Past | Independent | check | check | |
| 2015 | 1969 | Seth Sentry | Strange New Past | Independent | check | check | |
| 2015 | Don't Wait Up | Tuka | Life Death Time Eternal | EMI Music Australia | check | check | |
| 2015 | Everything | Tuka | Life Death Time Eternal | EMI Music Australia | check | check | |
| 2014 | Django | Miracle | Mainland | Sony Music | check | check | |
| 2014 | Learning | Miracle | Mainland | Sony Music | check | | |
| 2014 | Lost Boy | Miracle | Mainland | Sony Music | check | check | |
| 2014 | Nintendo | Miracle | Mainland | Sony Music | check | check | |
| 2014 | Rain Dance | Miracle | Mainland | Sony Music | check | check | |
| 2014 | Live It Up | 360 | Utopia | EMI Music Australia | check | check | Platinum |
| 2014 | Still Rap | 360 | Utopia | EMI Music Australia | check | check | Platinum |
| 2014 | Man on the Moon | 360 | Utopia | EMI Music Australia | check | check | Platinum |
| 2013 | Break of Dawn | Jay Sean, Busta Rhymes | Neon | Cash Money Records | check | check | |
| 2012 | Can You Feel It | Timomatic | Timomatic | Sony Music Australia | check | check | Platinum |
