= Better (Khalid song) =

2018 single by Khalid

Single by Khalid

from the EP Suncity
- Released: September 14, 2018
- Genre: R&B
- Length: 3:49 (single/album version): 3:20 (radio edit)
- Label: RCA
- Songwriters: Mikkel Storleer Eriksen; Tor Erik Hermansen; Ryan Vojtesak; Jamil Chammas; Khalid Robinson
- Producers: Denis Kosiak; StarGate; Digi; Charlie Handsome

Khalid singles chronology
"Eastside" (2018)	"Better" (2018)	"Saturday Nights Remix" (2019)

Music video
- "Better" on YouTube

"Better" is a song by American singer Khalid from his first EP Suncity (2018). It was released as the lead single from the EP on September 14, 2018. It was also included on the album Free Spirit. The song was a commercial success and became Khalid's first solo top 10 single in the United States.

== Commercial performance ==
"Better" peaked at number eight in the US in its 30th week, making it one of the slowest ascends to the top 10 on the Billboard Hot 100. Internationally, the song peaked at number 14 in Canada, number four in Malaysia, New Zealand, and Singapore, six in Australia, and various spots in the top 10 and top 40.

Additionally, "Better" marked Khalid's second number one on the Billboard Hot R&B Songs chart, following the 11-week run of "Young Dumb & Broke". It also became his first number-one on Billboard's Rhythmic chart in its February 16, 2019 issue.

== Charts ==
=== Weekly charts ===
Chart (2018–2019)	Peak position
Australia (ARIA)	6
Austria (Ö3 Austria Top 40)	36
Belgium (Ultratip Bubbling Under Flanders)	3
Belgium (Ultratip Bubbling Under Wallonia)	26
Canada Hot 100 (Billboard)	14
Canada CHR/Top 40 (Billboard)	24
Canada Hot AC (Billboard)	46
Czech Republic Singles Digital (ČNS IFPI)	21
Denmark (Tracklisten)	10
Germany (GfK)	49
Hungary (Stream Top 40)	24
Ireland (IRMA)	8
Lithuania (AGATA)	9
Malaysia (RIM)	4
Netherlands (Single Top 100)	30
New Zealand (Recorded Music NZ)	4
Norway (VG-lista)	9
Portugal (AFP)	6
Romania (Airplay 100)	91
Scottish Singles Sales (Official Charts)	57
Singapore (RIAS)	4
Slovakia Airplay (ČNS IFPI)	65
Slovakia Singles Digital (ČNS IFPI)	28
Sweden (Sverigetopplistan)	13
Switzerland (Schweizer Hitparade)	26
UK Singles (Official Charts)	15
US Billboard Hot 100	8
US Adult Pop Airplay (Billboard)	37
US Dance Airplay (Billboard)	18
US Hot R&B/Hip-Hop Songs (Billboard)	5
US Pop Airplay (Billboard)	5
US Rhythmic Airplay (Billboard)	1
US Rolling Stone Top 100	37

Chart (2022)	Peak position
South Africa (RISA)	93

=== Year-end charts ===
Chart (2018)	Position
Australia (ARIA)	77
Denmark (Tracklisten)	95
Portugal (AFP)	81
Chart (2019)	Position
Australia (ARIA)	28
Canada (Canadian Hot 100)	34
Denmark (Tracklisten)	98
New Zealand (Recorded Music NZ)	13
Portugal (AFP)	52
US Billboard Hot 100	20
US Hot R&B/Hip-Hop Songs (Billboard)	12
US Mainstream Top 40 (Billboard)	21
US Rhythmic (Billboard)	10
US Rolling Stone Top 100	21

== Certifications ==
Region	Certification	Certified units/sales
Australia (ARIA)	8× Platinum	560,000^{‡}
Austria (IFPI Austria)	Gold	15,000^{‡}
Brazil (Pro-Música Brasil)	Diamond	160,000^{‡}
Canada (Music Canada)	9× Platinum	720,000^{‡}
Denmark (IFPI Danmark)	Platinum	90,000^{‡}
France (SNEP)	Platinum	200,000^{‡}
Germany (BVMI)	Gold	200,000^{‡}
Italy (FIMI)	Gold	35,000^{‡}
New Zealand (RMNZ)	8× Platinum	240,000^{‡}
Norway (IFPI Norway)	Platinum	60,000^{‡}
Poland (ZPAV)	Platinum	20,000^{‡}
Portugal (AFP)	Platinum	10,000^{‡}
Spain (Promusicae)	Gold	30,000^{‡}
Switzerland (IFPI Switzerland)	Gold	10,000^{‡}
United Kingdom (BPI)	2× Platinum	1,200,000^{‡}
United States (RIAA)	6× Platinum	6,000,000^{‡}
Streaming
Sweden (GLF)	Gold	4,000,000^{†}
^{‡} Sales+streaming figures based on certification alone.^{†} Streaming-only figures based on certification alone.

== Release history ==
Region	Date	Format	Label	Ref.
United States	October 9, 2018	Contemporary hit radio	RCA	
United States	October 9, 2018	Rhythmic contemporary radio	RCA	
