= Saturday Nights (Khalid song) =

Single by Khalid and Kane Brown

from the EP Suncity
- Released: January 11, 2019
- Genre: R&B
- Length: 3:31
- Label: RCA
- Songwriters: Khalid Robinson; Ryan Vojtesak; Jamil Chammas
- Producers: Charlie Handsome; Digi; Denis Kosiak

Khalid singles chronology
"Better" (2018)	"Saturday Nights" (2019)	"Talk" (2019)

Kane Brown singles chronology
"Good as You" (2019)	"Saturday Nights" (2019)	"One Thing Right" (2019)

Music video
- "Saturday Nights" (Remix) on YouTube

"Saturday Nights" is a song by American singer Khalid from his 2018 EP Suncity. The original solo version charted as a song from the EP upon its release in October 2018, then was released as a single in a remix version with fellow American singer Kane Brown on January 11, 2019. The remix reached a peak of number 57 on the US Billboard Hot 100 in January 2019. The song was later included as a bonus track on his second album, Free Spirit, and the remix was included on the Japanese deluxe edition of the album.

== Charts ==
=== Original version ===
==== Weekly charts ====
Chart (2018–19)	Peak position
Australia (ARIA)	27
Belgium (Ultratip Bubbling Under Flanders)	2
Czech Republic Singles Digital (ČNS IFPI)	46
Denmark (Tracklisten)	30
Germany (GfK)	91
Ireland (IRMA)	9
Netherlands (Single Top 100)	61
New Zealand (Recorded Music NZ)	8
Norway (VG-lista)	30
Portugal (AFP)	20
Slovakia Singles Digital (ČNS IFPI)	41
Sweden (Sverigetopplistan)	77
Switzerland (Schweizer Hitparade)	68
UK Singles (Official Charts)	31

==== Year-end charts ====
Chart (2019)	Position
Australia (ARIA)	70
Ireland (IRMA)	49
New Zealand (Recorded Music NZ)	17
Portugal (AFP)	130
US Rolling Stone Top 100	77

=== Remix ===
==== Weekly charts ====
Chart (2019)	Peak position
Canada Hot 100 (Billboard)	31
US Billboard Hot 100	57
US Adult Pop Airplay (Billboard)	38
US Hot R&B/Hip-Hop Songs (Billboard)	21

==== Year-end charts ====
Chart (2019)	Position
Canada (Canadian Hot 100)	72
US Hot R&B/Hip-Hop Songs (Billboard)	70

== Certifications ==
Region	Certification	Certified units/sales
Australia (ARIA)	2× Platinum	140,000^{‡}
Austria (IFPI Austria)	Gold	15,000^{‡}
Brazil (Pro-Música Brasil)	Platinum	40,000^{‡}
Canada (Music Canada)	6× Platinum	480,000^{‡}
Denmark (IFPI Danmark)	Platinum	90,000^{‡}
New Zealand (RMNZ)	4× Platinum	120,000^{‡}
Portugal (AFP)	Gold	5,000^{‡}
Switzerland (IFPI Switzerland)	Gold	10,000^{‡}
United Kingdom (BPI)	Platinum	600,000^{‡}
United States (RIAA)	4× Platinum	4,000,000^{‡}
^{‡} Sales+streaming figures based on certification alone.
