= PrettyMuch =

American pop and R&B boy band

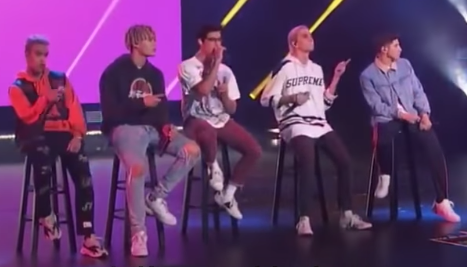
- PrettyMuch in 2018 (L–R): Edwin Honoret, Zion Kuwonu, Brandon Arreaga, Austin Porter, and Nick Mara

Background information
- Origin: Los Angeles, California, U.S.
- Genres: Pop; R&B
- Years active: 2016–2023
- Labels: Syco; Columbia; Sire
- Past members: Brandon Arreaga; Edwin Honoret; Austin Porter; Zion Kuwonu; Nick Mara
- Website: prettymuch.com

PRETTYMUCH were an American-Canadian pop and R&B boy band based in Los Angeles, California. The band consisted of Brandon Arreaga, Nick Mara, Edwin Honoret, Austin Porter and Zion Kuwonu. They released five EPs and a debut album before disbanding in 2023.

== Career ==
=== 2016–2017: Formation and early career ===
The members of PrettyMuch were pursuing solo careers until Syco Music founder Simon Cowell and former label president Sonny Takhar merged them into a group. Since 2016, the members of PrettyMuch have been based in Los Angeles where they have shared a home since March 18, 2016, in which they have worked on their dancing skills in addition to recording their debut EP.

In 2017, PrettyMuch gained attention on social media with their cover songs and dancing videos, including a rendition of Charlie Puth's "Attention" and choreography tributes to Michael Jackson and Bruno Mars.

PrettyMuch's debut single, "Would You Mind," written by Savan Kotecha and Jacob Kasher, was released in July 2017. A month later, the group performed the song at the 2017 Teen Choice Awards and sang an a cappella version on the red carpet at the 2017 MTV Video Music Awards. A music video for the song was then released in September. Directed by Emil Nava, it depicts the members dancing and jumping over each other in empty alleyways, along with scenes from a road trip the group had taken. The clip was inspired by boy band videos of the late 1990s and early 2000s, such as Backstreet Boys' "We've Got It Goin' On" and NSYNC's "I Want You Back". The single peaked in the top 40 on Billboard's Mainstream Top 40 charts.

PrettyMuch performed "Would You Mind" on MTV's Total Request Live in October 2017 and released their second single, "Teacher". This single and its music video have been accused of being very similar to those of Dead Obies' "Where They @". On October 27, 2017, they released their single, "Open Arms". In November 2017, they confirmed via Twitter that they would perform during the final of series 14 of The X Factor in the United Kingdom, performing their single, "No More".

=== 2018–2019: PrettyMuch an EP, Phases, and INTL:EP ===
PrettyMuch had their own tour called PrettyMuch Everywhere Tour across the United States. The group performed on Good Morning America on January 15. PrettyMuch performed their singles "Open Arms" and "No More" on MTV's Total Request Live on January 17.

They released their debut EP, Prettymuch an EP on April 19, 2018, including their single "10,000 Hours". On June 21, 2018, they released a summer single "Summer On You," written by Ed Sheeran and produced by Steve Mac. They also performed it on the Late Late Show with James Corden. On August 20, 2018, the group performed at the 2018 MTV Video Music Awards on the Push Artist Stage. The single peaked in the top 50 on Pop radio. On September 28, 2018, they released their single "Solita" featuring Rich the Kid. They released their song "Real Friends" on October 17, 2018, to promote their fall tour, the Funktion Tour, and afterward "Jello," on December 14, 2018, accompanied by an official video. In the start of 2019, "Blind" (stylized as "BLiND") was released on January 25. Their second single of 2019, "Phases," was released on April 26, alongside a music video featuring model Justine Mae Biticon. On May 17, PrettyMuch announced their second EP would come out a week later. On May 20, the band released "Gone 2 Long," written and produced completely by Brandon Arreaga. The group's second EP, the Phases - EP, was released on May 24, 2019. The EP consists of six songs: two already released songs ("Phases" and "Gone 2 Long"), and four new songs called "Eyes Off You", "Temporary Heart", "4U" and "One Shot".

On July 11, PrettyMuch kicked off their FOMO Tour with opening act Kenzie Ziegler in Dallas, Texas. A week later, on July 19, the band released "Lying," a collaboration with Lil Tjay. On November 22, PrettyMuch released INTL:EP, which features "Me Necesita," a collaboration with Latin-American boy band CNCO, and three other songs, with guest vocals from Luísa Sonza, NCT Dream, and Iñigo Pascual.

=== 2020–2023: New label and Smackables ===
On March 10, 2020, PrettyMuch was announced as an opening act for select US dates of Camila Cabello's The Romance Tour, but the tour was later cancelled due to the COVID-19 pandemic.

Following a year of more participation in their music, PrettyMuch was musically silent for the entirety of 2020, but continued to remain active on social media. Later in the year, it was revealed that Syco Music, the band's record label, had been dissolved. In December 2020, PrettyMuch announced they had signed to Sire Records. They began teasing their comeback to releasing music on their social media, as well as posting a countdown on their website to January 22, 2021.

On January 17, 2021, the band revealed that a new single was set to be released that week, posting the cover art with the title hidden by asterisks (stars). Five days later, "Stars" was released to all streaming platforms, along with a music video. On the same day, PrettyMuch announced their label debut EP, Smackables. The EP was released a week later on January 29, along with a music video for the song "Parking Spot" featuring actress and model Alexia Castillo.

In an interview with GQ, it was revealed that "Corpus Christi," a song initially thought to be on the original Smackables EP would be released on a deluxe version of Smackables. This also served as a simultaneous, unofficial announcement of Smackables (Deluxe Version). On February 19, the music video for "Lonely" was premiered on PrettyMuch's YouTube channel. On February 26, 2021, the deluxe version of the Smackables EP was released on Sire Records. The deluxe EP included "Corpus Christi," a song written mainly by Brandon Arreaga featuring a production credit from Lido, and "Smackables," the long-awaited title track teased by the band in various YouTube videos throughout 2020.

Prior to the release of Smackables (Deluxe Edition), PrettyMuch announced a "Smackables EP Release Party," hosted by Moment House. The release party was held in three installments, each for a different region of the world on March 4 or 5th, 2021, to accommodate their global fans. The party consisted of the band doing short commentaries on three songs ("Free," "Lonely," and "Corpus Christi") and playing them for fans, performing three of the songs off the complete Smackables EP ("Stars," "Parking Spot," and "Smackables"), and a special premiere of the "Corpus Christi" music video. The official "Corpus Christi" video, directed by Boni Mata, was released on March 9, 2021. PrettyMuch also performed their song "Stars" on Good Morning America on March 16.

After sharing a teaser on TikTok, PrettyMuch released "Trust" on July 30, 2021. The official video, which was released on the same day, is directed by Ian Eastwood and edited by Brandon Arreaga.

On October 7, 2022, PRETTYMUCH announced that Nick Mara is leaving the band and the group is continuing to make music as a four-piece. Along with the announcement, the remaining members released the song "H2L" on the music platform Sound.xyz.

On October 29, 2023, via an Instagram post, the group announced that they were disbanding.

== Band members ==
=== Brandon Arreaga ===
Brandon Michael Lee Arreaga (born December 14, 1999) grew up in Corinth, Texas. He began doing acting and modeling jobs at around eleven years old, and used money earned from the jobs to get equipment for a home studio. Arreaga would rent the studio out to other local musicians. He was the last member to join the group, as he did not initially get involved because his parents thought the scouting was fake.

=== Edwin Honoret ===
Edwin Joel Honoret (born February 12, 1999) is from The Bronx, New York. He is of Dominican descent.

=== Austin Porter ===
Austin Dale Porter (born August 14, 1997) grew up in Charlotte, North Carolina. Prior to the audition, Porter had a solo career, having released a pop album titled One Love in 2013 and made an unreleased rap EP. He is inspired by a variety of different genres including lo-fi hip-hop and jazz. He has listed Elton John, James Taylor, Chicago and The Beatles as some of his musical influences.

=== Zion Kuwonu ===
Caleb Zion Kuwonu (born June 29, 1999) is from Ottawa, Canada. He was inspired to become a singer after watching Justin Bieber: Never Say Never, and lists Justin Bieber as one of his musical inspirations, among other artists such as PartyNextDoor, One Direction, and Michael Jackson. Kuwonu was noticed by Sony Music after he began posting song covers on Vine in order to gain popularity at school. He has noted that he only had around 150 followers at the time. He has a dog.

=== Nick Mara ===
Nicholas Carter Mara (born November 8, 1997) was born in New York, but grew up in Englishtown, New Jersey. He began dancing at around nine years old, and was formerly in the dance crew ICONic Boyz, which was featured in the sixth season of America's Best Dance Crew. Mara describes his musical interest as "Bad Boy-era type music," being inspired by artists such as Notorious B.I.G. In October 2022, he left the band to pursue a solo career.

== Discography ==
PrettyMuch discography
- Studio albums: 1
- EPs: 5
- Singles: 25
- Music videos: 23

PrettyMuch have released one studio album, five extended plays, twenty-five singles, and twenty-three music videos.

=== Studio albums ===
List of studio albums
Title	Album details
This Thing Called Love	Released: May 26, 2023; Label: Self-released; Format: Digital download, streaming

=== Extended plays ===
List of extended plays
Title	EP details
PrettyMuch So Far...	Released: March 23, 2018; Label: Syco; Format: Digital download, streaming
PrettyMuch an EP	Released: April 19, 2018; Label: Syco; Format: Digital download, streaming
Phases - EP	Released: May 24, 2019; Label: Syco; Format: Digital download, streaming
INTL:EP	Released: November 22, 2019; Label: Syco; Format: Digital download, streaming
Smackables	Released: January 29, 2021; Label: Sire Records; Format: Digital download, streaming
Smackables (Deluxe Edition)	Released: February 26, 2021; Label: Sire Records; Format: Digital download, streaming

=== Singles ===
List of singles as lead artist, with selected chart positions and certifications, showing year released and album name
Title	Year	Peak chart positions			Album
Title	Year	US Pop	NZ Hot	UK	Album
"Would You Mind"	2017	40	—	100	PrettyMuch So Far...
"Teacher"	2017	—	—	—	PrettyMuch So Far...
"Open Arms"	2017	—	—	—	PrettyMuch So Far...
"No More" (featuring French Montana)	2017	—	—	77	PrettyMuch So Far...
"Hello"	2018	—	—	—	PrettyMuch an EP
"10,000 Hours"	2018	—	—	—	PrettyMuch an EP
"Healthy"	2018	—	—	—	PrettyMuch an EP
"On My Way"	2018	—	—	—	PrettyMuch an EP
"Summer on You"	2018	49	—	—	Non-album singles
"Solita" (featuring Rich the Kid)	2018	—	—	—	Non-album singles
"Real Friends"	2018	—	—	—	Non-album singles
"Jello"	2018	—	34	—	Non-album singles
"Blind"	2019	—	—	—	Non-album singles
"Phases"	2019	—	26	—	Phases EP
"Gone 2 Long"	2019	—	—	—	Phases EP
"Eyes Off You"	2019	—	—	—	Phases EP
"Lying" (featuring Lil Tjay)	2019	—	19	—	Non-album singles
"Rock Witchu"	2019	—	—	—	Non-album singles
"Me Necesita" (with CNCO)	2019	—	—	—	INTL:EP
"Up to You" (with NCT Dream)	2019	—	—	—	INTL:EP
"Stars"	2021	—	—	—	Smackables
"Lonely"	2021	—	—	—	Smackables (Deluxe Edition)
"Trust"	2021	—	—	—	Non-album singles
"I Don't Wanna Leave" (featuring Jeremih)	2021	—	—	—	Non-album singles
"Talking 2 You"	2022	—	—	—	Non-album singles
"Same Place"	2023	—	—	—	This Thing Called Love
"Wrong?"	2023	—	—	—	This Thing Called Love
"Excited"	2023	—	—	—	This Thing Called Love
"Maria"	2023	—	—	—	This Thing Called Love
"Alone"	2023	—	—	—	This Thing Called Love
"Before You" (with angelbaby)	2023	—	—	—	Non-album singles
"—" denotes releases that did not chart or were not released in that region.

=== Music videos ===
List of music videos, showing year released and directors
Title	Year	Director	Ref.
"Would You Mind"	2017	Emil Nava	
"Teacher"	2017	Noah Duran	
"Open Arms"	2017	Noah Duran	
"No More"	2017	Emil Nava	
"10,000 Hours"	2018	Noah Duran	
"Hello"	2018	Noah Duran	
"Summer on You"	2018	Tim Mattia	
"Jello"	2018	The Young Astronauts	
"Blind"	2019	The Young Astronauts	
"Phases"	2019	The Young Astronauts	
"Lying"	2019	The Young Astronauts	
"Me Necesita"	2019	Isaac Rentz	
"The Weekend"	2019		
"Love"	2019		
"Stars"	2021	Natalie Fält	
"Parking Spot"	2021	Steven Mertens	
"Free"	2021	Keenan O'Reilly	
"Lonely"	2021	Natalie Fält	
"Smackables"	2021	Ian Eastwood	
"Corpus Christi"	2021	Boni Mata	
"Trust"	2021	Ian Eastwood	
"I Don't Wanna Leave"	2021	Lucas Chemotti	
"Same Place"	2023	Brandon Arreaga	
"Excited"	2023	Brandon Arreaga	
"Alone"	2023		

== Awards and nominations ==
Year	Nominated	Award	Category	Result	Ref.
2018	PrettyMuch	iHeart Radio Music Awards	Best Boyband	Nominated	
2018	PrettyMuch	MTV Video Music Awards	Push Artist of the Year	Nominated	
2018	PrettyMuch	MTV Europe Music Awards	Best Push	Nominated	
2018	PrettyMuch	MTV Europe Music Awards	Best Group	Nominated	
2019	PrettyMuch	Teen Choice Awards	Choice Music Group	Nominated	
2019	PrettyMuch	MTV Video Music Awards	Best Group	Nominated	

== Tours ==
Headlining

- PrettyMuch Everywhere Tour (2018)
- Funktion Tour (2018)
- FOMO Tour (2019)

Supporting

- Jack & Jack – Fall 2017 Tour (2017)
- Khalid – Roxy Tour (2018)
