= Young Dumb & Broke =

- Remix cover

Single by Khalid

from the album American Teen
- A-side: "Location"
- Released: June 13, 2017
- Recorded: 2016
- Genre: R&B
- Length: 3:22
- Label: Right Hand; RCA
- Songwriters: Khalid Robinson; Joel Little; Talay Riley
- Producer: Joel Little

Khalid singles chronology
"Rollin" (2017)	"Young Dumb & Broke" (2017)	"Silence" (2017)

Music video
- "Young Dumb & Broke" on YouTube

"Young Dumb & Broke" is a song by American singer Khalid. It was released as a single on June 13, 2017, by Right Hand Music Group and RCA Records as the second single from his debut studio album American Teen.

"Young Dumb & Broke" reached the top 20 on the Billboard Hot 100, peaking at number 18. Furthermore, the song peaked at number one in the Philippines and New Zealand and it peaked at number four in Australia. As of December 2023, the single has been certified Diamond by the Recording Industry Association of America, and has been streamed over one billion times on Spotify. The accompanying music video features multiple celebrity cameos, including Normani, Kel Mitchell, Wayne Brady, Rachael Leigh Cook, and Dennis Haskins.

== Critical reception ==
The Guardian's Graeme Virtue says that "More decrepit listeners might detect echoes of the Cure's 'Close to Me' amid 'Young Dumb & Broke''s palliative organ spiral, but that just adds to the bittersweet vibe of taken-for-granted golden years turning to ash."

== Music video ==
The song's accompanying music video premiered on August 1, 2017, on Khalid's Vevo account on YouTube. As of October 2024, the music video has over 980 million views.

The music video features cameo appearances from VanJess, Demetrius Harmon, Nathan Zed, Zolee Griggs, Salem Mitchell, Widney Bazile, Quiñ, Will Peltz, Buddy, Normani, Kel Mitchell, Wayne Brady, Rachael Leigh Cook and Dennis Haskins. "Young Dumb & Broke" was released as a virtual reality video for PlayStation VR on March 29, 2018.

== Live performances ==
American rock band Imagine Dragons performed their song "Thunder" at the 2017 American Music Awards in a mash-up with "Young Dumb & Broke", with Khalid joining them for the performance. A little over a month later, on December 20, a studio version of the mash-up was released.

== Chart performance ==
"Young Dumb & Broke" peaked at number 18 on the Billboard Hot 100 and number 17 on the UK Singles Chart. The song topped the charts in New Zealand and the Philippines and peaked at number four in Australia. It also peaked at number one for 11 weeks on the Billboard R&B Songs chart.

== Use in the media ==
"Young Dumb & Broke" is featured on the soundtrack of the 2021 BBC comedy The Outlaws in episode 4.

== Track listing ==
Digital download
No.	Title	Length
1.	"Young Dumb & Broke"	3:22

Digital download – remix
No.	Title	Length
1.	"Young Dumb & Broke" (remix) (featuring Rae Sremmurd and Lil Yachty)	4:23

Digital download – medley
No.	Title	Length
1.	"Thunder / Young Dumb & Broke" (medley) (with Imagine Dragons)	4:11

== Charts ==
=== Weekly charts ===
Chart (2017–2018)	Peak position
Australia (ARIA)	4
Australia Urban (ARIA)	2
Austria (Ö3 Austria Top 40)	62
Belgium (Ultratip Bubbling Under Flanders)	2
Belgium (Ultratip Bubbling Under Wallonia)	25
Canada Hot 100 (Billboard)	22
Czech Republic Singles Digital (ČNS IFPI)	42
Denmark (Tracklisten)	14
France (SNEP)	145
Germany (GfK)	56
Ireland (IRMA)	17
Latvia (DigiTop100)	18
Malaysia Streaming (RIM)	9
Mexico Ingles Airplay (Billboard)	2
Netherlands (Single Top 100)	63
New Zealand (Recorded Music NZ)	1
Norway (VG-lista)	37
Philippines (BillboardPH Hot 100)	1
Portugal (AFP)	41
Scottish Singles Sales (Official Charts)	21
Slovakia Singles Digital (ČNS IFPI)	38
Sweden (Sverigetopplistan)	63
Switzerland (Schweizer Hitparade)	89
UK Singles (Official Charts)	17
US Billboard Hot 100	18
US Hot R&B/Hip-Hop Songs (Billboard)	8
US Pop Airplay (Billboard)	17
US Rhythmic Airplay (Billboard)	4

==== Medley version ====
Chart (2018)	Peak position
US Billboard Hot 100	69
US Hot Rock & Alternative Songs (Billboard)	4

=== Year-end charts ===
Chart (2017)	Position
Australia (ARIA)	38
Canada (Canadian Hot 100)	85
Denmark (Tracklisten)	85
New Zealand (Recorded Music NZ)	16
Portugal Streaming Songs (AFP)	99
US Billboard Hot 100	78
US Hot R&B/Hip-Hop Songs (Billboard)	41
US Rhythmic (Billboard)	38
Chart (2018)	Position
Australia (ARIA)	55
Canada (Canadian Hot 100)	81
New Zealand (Recorded Music NZ)	48
Portugal (AFP)	156
US Billboard Hot 100	67
US Hot R&B/Hip-Hop Songs (Billboard)	66

==== Medley version ====
Chart (2018)	Position
US Hot Rock Songs (Billboard)	43

== Certifications ==
Certifications for "Young Dumb & Broke"
Region	Certification	Certified units/sales
Australia (ARIA)	8× Platinum	560,000^{‡}
Brazil (Pro-Música Brasil)	2× Platinum	120,000^{‡}
Canada (Music Canada)	9× Platinum	720,000^{‡}
Denmark (IFPI Danmark)	2× Platinum	180,000^{‡}
France (SNEP)	Gold	100,000^{‡}
Germany (BVMI)	Gold	200,000^{‡}
Italy (FIMI)	Gold	25,000^{‡}
Mexico (AMPROFON)	4× Platinum+Gold	270,000^{‡}
New Zealand (RMNZ)	7× Platinum	210,000^{‡}
Norway (IFPI Norway)	Platinum	60,000^{‡}
Poland (ZPAV)	Platinum	20,000^{‡}
Portugal (AFP)	Gold	5,000^{‡}
Spain (Promusicae)	Gold	30,000^{‡}
Sweden (GLF)	Gold	20,000^{‡}
Switzerland (IFPI Switzerland)	Gold	10,000^{‡}
United Kingdom (BPI)	2× Platinum	1,200,000^{‡}
United States (RIAA)	Diamond	10,000,000^{‡}
^{‡} Sales+streaming figures based on certification alone.

== Release history ==
Region	Date	Format	Version	Label	Ref.
Various	February 2, 2017	Digital download	Original	Right Hand; RCA	
Various	June 7, 2017	Digital download	Remix	Right Hand; RCA	
United States	June 13, 2017	Rhythmic contemporary radio	Original	Right Hand; RCA	
United States	September 26, 2017	Contemporary hit radio	Original	Right Hand; RCA	
Various	December 20, 2017	Digital download	Medley	Right Hand; RCA	

== See also ==
- List of 2010s number-one singles in New Zealand
- Location (Khalid song)
- Better (Khalid song)
