= Miss Shiney =

Single by Kaiit
- Released: 3 May 2019
- Length: 3:12
- Label: Alt. Music Group
- Songwriter(s): Kaiit Bellamia Waup

Kaiit singles chronology
"Warning" (2018)	"Miss Shiney" (2019)	"Space" (2024)

Music video
- "Miss Shiney" on YouTube

"Miss Shiney" is a song made by Australian recording artist Kaiit. The song was released on 3 May 2019.

Kaiit said the song is about writer's block and self-doubt. "This track is more of a reminder for me, something I listen to when I'm trippin' and need something to remind me that I got this! You that girl, and people heal from my words!"

The song won Best Unpublished Work at the 2019 Vanda & Young Global Songwriting Competition.

At the ARIA Music Awards of 2019, the song won the ARIA award for Best Soul/R&B Release.

== Reception ==
Chris Singh from The AU review listed the track as the single of the day calling the song "charming" saying the song is a "confident jam which speaks of self-reflection and staying grounded in the face of self-doubt.".

Wonderland Magazine said "As the first few funk-filled guitar riffs reverberate and an effortlessly sharp 'do, do, do, do' pierces the air, you know you're in for something special."
