= American Teen (album) =

Studio album by Khalid
- Released: March 3, 2017
- Recorded: 2016–2017
- Studios: Various: Beacon Hill Recording Studio (El Paso, TX); Golden Age (Los Angeles, CA); Body High Studios (Los Angeles, CA); Gower House (Los Angeles, CA); Temple Base Studios (Los Angeles, CA); Black Wax Studio (New York, NY); The Premises (London, United Kingdom); Sony/ATV Studios (London, United Kingdom)
- Genres: R&B; teen pop
- Length: 54:37
- Labels: Right Hand; RCA
- Producers: Syk Sense (also exec.); Alfredo Gonzalez; Bryan Medina; Daniel Picciotto; Dave Sava6e; DJDS; Hiko Momoji; !llmind; Joel Little; Jay Knight; OZ; Scribz; Sevn Thomas; Skrittzy; Smash David; Chris McClenney; The Arcade; Tiggi; Tunji Ige; UNO Stereo

Khalid chronology
American Teen (2017)	Suncity (2018)

Singles from American Teen
- 1. "Location" Released: May 2016; 2. "Young Dumb & Broke" Released: June 13, 2017; 3. "Saved" Released: October 30, 2017

American Teen is the debut studio album by American singer Khalid. It was released on March 3, 2017, by Right Hand Music Group and RCA Records. The album was supported by the Billboard Hot 100 top 20 singles "Location" and "Young Dumb & Broke"; as well as the third single "Saved".

In October 2017, the album was certified platinum by the Recording Industry Association of America (RIAA) for accumulating over one million in combined pure sales and album-equivalent units. The album received a Grammy Award nomination for Best Urban Contemporary Album while its lead single "Location" was nominated for Best R&B Song at the 60th Annual Grammy Awards. In March 2022, the album was certified 4× platinum by the RIAA.

== Singles ==
The lead single from the album, called "Location" was released in May 2016. The song peaked at 16 on the Billboard Hot 100. The music video for "Location" was released on September 26, 2016. "Young Dumb & Broke" was sent to rhythmic radio on June 13, 2017, as the second single. "Saved" was released as the third single on October 30, 2017.

=== Promotional singles ===
"Let's Go" was released as the first promotional single from the album on September 12, 2016. It is also Khalid's first released song. "Hopeless" was released as the second promotional single on October 27, 2016. "Coaster" was released as the third promotional single on December 16, 2016. "Shot Down" was released as the fourth promotional single on February 6, 2017. "American Teen" was released as the fifth and final promotional single on February 22, 2017.

The promotional single "Reasons" was released on December 2, 2016, but was not included on American Teen.

== Commercial performance ==
American Teen debuted at number nine on the Billboard 200 with 37,000 album-equivalent units, of which 12,000 were pure album sales. In August 2017, it reached a peak of number four. On October 24, 2017, the album was certified platinum by the Recording Industry Association of America (RIAA) for combined sales, streaming and track-sales equivalent of one million units. By the end of 2017, American Teen had accumulated 1,220,000 album-equivalent units in the United States, with 147,000 being pure sales.

== Critical reception ==
Professional ratings
Review scores
Source	Rating
AllMusic	3/5 stars
Exclaim!	8/10
The New Zealand Herald	4/5 stars
Newsday	B+
Vice	A

Reviewing for Vice, Robert Christgau said that "the first half of this R&B album justifies its title with a clarity and candor so astonishing it overshadows the music's racial identity [...] Second half is skillful but conventional—seven succinct, catchy unrequited love songs all in a row. Khalid Robinson sings in a winning conversational murmur with room for growth, and because the vocals are as unassuming as the words, the song structures he concocts with various pals and pros seems more straightforward than they are." He later called the album a "teenpop milestone". Ryan B. Patrick of Exclaim! wrote that the album "generally plays things straight up, not too concerned about chasing bleeding edge sounds but resting nicely in the pocket between conventional R&B and a future-pop-minded audience". Glenn Gamboa of Newsday gave the album a grade of B+ and summarized that American Teen shows Khalid as a "natural" and "establishes him as one of R&B's up-and-coming stars". In a three-star review for AllMusic, Andy Kellman said that on lead single "Location" "and through much of what fills out American Teen, [...] Robinson's not one to get worked up. He's in no particular rush, content to drift through life while accepting, and occasionally sort of celebrating, the present."

== Track listing ==
Credits adapted from liner notes.

No.	Title	Writer(s)	Producer(s)	Length
1.	"American Teen"	Khalid Robinson; Atilla Elçi; Orlando Gomez; Alfredo Gonzalez; Leslie Johnson	Hiko Momoji	4:10
2.	"Young Dumb & Broke"	Robinson; Joel Little; Talay Riley	Little	3:22
3.	"Location"	Robinson; Joshua Scruggs; Samuel David Jimenez; Christopher McClenney; Olatunji Ige; Austin Mensales; Gonzalez; Barjam Kurti	Syk Sense; Smash David; Tunji Ige; Gonzalez^{[a]}	3:39
4.	"Another Sad Love Song"	Robinson; Jerome Potter; Sam Griesemer	DJDS	4:04
5.	"Saved"	Robinson; Scruggs; Ozan Yildirim; Bryan Medina; Cameron Hale; Calvin Tarvin	Syk Sense; OZ; Medina; Tiggi^{[a]}	3:26
6.	"Coaster"	Robinson; Nathaniel Hernandez	Skrittzy	3:19
7.	"8teen"	Robinson; Little	Little	3:48
8.	"Let's Go"	Robinson; Yildirim; Elçi; Noah Gale; Daniel Picciotto	OZ; Momoji; Picciotto^{[a]}	3:24
9.	"Hopeless"	Robinson; Elçi	Momoji	2:47
10.	"Cold Blooded"	Robinson; Kurtis McKenzie; Jon Mills; Nick Martin; Carl Dimataga	The Arcade; UNO Stereo^{[a]}	3:27
11.	"Winter"	Robinson; Mike "Scribz" Riley	Scribz; GRADES	4:01
12.	"Therapy"	Robinson; Little	Little	4:17
13.	"Keep Me"	Robinson; Rupert Thomas, Jr.; Scruggs; Yildirim; Jake Austin	Sevn Thomas; Syk Sense; OZ; Dave Sava6e^{[a]}	4:36
14.	"Shot Down"	Robinson; Scruggs; Ramon Ibanga	Syk Sense; !llmind	3:27
15.	"Angels"	Robinson; Gonzalez; Scruggs	Gonzalez; Syk Sense; Rangi	2:50
Total length:				54:37

Japan edition bonus track
No.	Title	Length
16.	"Location" (featuring Lil Wayne and Kehlani)	4:38
Total length:		59:25

Notes

- "8teen" is stylized as "8TEEN".
- ^{^[a]} signifies an additional producer.

== Charts ==
=== Weekly charts ===
Chart (2017–2021)	Peak position
Australian Albums (ARIA)	13
Australian Urban Albums (ARIA)	3
Belgian Albums (Ultratop Flanders)	69
Belgian Albums (Ultratop Wallonia)	199
Canadian Albums (Billboard)	7
Danish Albums (Hitlisten)	2
Dutch Albums (Album Top 100)	26
Finnish Albums (Suomen virallinen lista)	46
French Albums (SNEP)	177
Irish Albums (IRMA)	18
Latvian Albums (LaIPA)	14
New Zealand Albums (RMNZ)	5
Norwegian Albums (VG-lista)	7
Swedish Albums (Sverigetopplistan)	15
UK Albums (Official Charts)	44
US Billboard 200	4
US Top R&B/Hip-Hop Albums (Billboard)	3

=== Year-end charts ===
Chart (2017)	Position
Australian Albums (ARIA)	40
Canadian Albums (Billboard)	21
Danish Albums (Hitlisten)	16
Dutch Albums (MegaCharts)	83
Icelandic Albums (Plötutíóindi)	47
New Zealand Albums (RMNZ)	20
Swedish Albums (Sverigetopplistan)	57
US Billboard 200	14
US Top R&B/Hip-Hop Albums (Billboard)	7

Chart (2018)	Position
Australian Albums (ARIA)	32
Belgian Albums (Ultratop Flanders)	198
Canadian Albums (Billboard)	18
Danish Albums (Hitlisten)	10
Dutch Albums (MegaCharts)	90
Icelandic Albums (Plötutíóindi)	46
New Zealand Albums (RMNZ)	21
Swedish Albums (Sverigetopplistan)	41
UK Albums (OCC)	97
US Billboard 200	15
US Top R&B/Hip-Hop Albums (Billboard)	11

Chart (2019)	Position
Australian Albums (ARIA)	34
Belgian Albums (Ultratop Flanders)	166
Canadian Albums (Billboard)	36
Danish Albums (Hitlisten)	38
Icelandic Albums (Plötutíóindi)	93
Swedish Albums (Sverigetopplistan)	74
US Billboard 200	33
US Top R&B/Hip-Hop Albums (Billboard)	17

Chart (2020)	Position
Australian Albums (ARIA)	65
Belgian Albums (Ultratop Flanders)	161
Danish Albums (Hitlisten)	58
New Zealand Albums (RMNZ)	40
US Billboard 200	68
US Top R&B/Hip-Hop Albums (Billboard)	40

Chart (2021)	Position
Australian Albums (ARIA)	84
Danish Albums (Hitlisten)	72
US Billboard 200	85
US Top R&B/Hip-Hop Albums (Billboard)	67

Chart (2022)	Position
US Billboard 200	149

=== Decade-end charts ===
Chart (2010–2019)	Position
US Billboard 200	35

== Certifications ==
Region	Certification	Certified units/sales
Australia (ARIA)	Platinum	70,000^{‡}
Brazil (Pro-Música Brasil)	Gold	20,000^{‡}
Canada (Music Canada)	4× Platinum	320,000^{‡}
Denmark (IFPI Danmark)	4× Platinum	80,000^{‡}
France (SNEP)	Gold	50,000^{‡}
Mexico (AMPROFON)	Gold	30,000^{‡}
New Zealand (RMNZ)	6× Platinum	90,000^{‡}
Norway (IFPI Norway)	Platinum	20,000^{‡}
Poland (ZPAV)	Gold	10,000^{‡}
Singapore (RIAS)	Platinum	10,000^{*}
Sweden (GLF)	Gold	15,000^{‡}
Switzerland (IFPI Switzerland)	Gold	10,000^{‡}
United Kingdom (BPI)	Platinum	300,000^{‡}
United States (RIAA)	4× Platinum	4,000,000^{‡}
^{*} Sales figures based on certification alone.^{‡} Sales+streaming figures based on certification alone.
