= Location (Khalid song) =

2016 single by Khalid

Single by Khalid

from the album American Teen
- B-side: "Young, Dumb & Broke"
- Released: May 19, 2016 (Note: "Location" showed a May 19, 2016 release date on iTunes and Apple Music, and showed a May 24, 2016 release date on Spotify.)
- Recorded: 2014
- Studio: Beacon Hill Recording Studios (El Paso, Texas)
- Genre: Alternative R&B
- Length: 3:37
- Label: Right Hand; RCA
- Songwriters: Khalid Robinson; Joshua Scruggs; Austin Mensales; Chris McClenney; Samuel Jimenez; Olatunji Ige; Alfredo Gonzalez; Barjam Kurti
- Producers: Syk Sense; Tunji Ige; Chris McClenney; Smash David; Gonzalez; Mensales; Kurti

Khalid singles chronology
"Location" (2016)	"Electric" (2017)

"Location" is the debut single by American singer Khalid. It was uploaded to SoundCloud on April 30, 2016, and released commercially in May 2016, serving as the lead single from his debut studio album American Teen (2017). The track was written alongside producers Syk Sense, Tunji Ige, Chris McClenney, Smash David, Alfredo Gonzalez, Austin Mensales, and Barjam Kurti Recorded at Beacon Hill Recording Studios, the song has been certified Diamond by the Recording Industry Association of America (RIAA). “Location” was nominated for Best R&B Song at the 60th Annual Grammy Awards.

== Background ==
While talking about the song in an interview with Pigeons & Planes, Khalid expressed his passion of the song's beat:

"Location" is a song that came to me out of nowhere. From the first time I heard the beat play, the words flew out. Hearing the chords instantly took me the first stage of a relationship. Young love, man. It’s a crazy thing. I first started making music in the winter of 2015 so this is one of my most developed songs so far."

Sheet music for the song "Location" shows the key of C♯ Minor and a tempo of 80 beats per minute.

== Music video ==
The song's accompanying music video premiered on September 26, 2016, on Khalid's Vevo account on YouTube and was directed by Alex Di Marco. As of May 2023, the music video has over 552 million views. The video opens with a screenshot of a desert and a hand on a steering wheel, then quickly showing how to pronounce Khalid (kuh-leed), Khalid is then seen sitting on top of a car performing the song and then walks around a desert and receives a message, which is a "Location", He gets in his car and drives to the Location, The location turns out to be a swimming pool, Khalid is then seen back in his car, driving back to the pool when his phone displays "Arrived", Khalid is grabbed by two women but breaks free and two men look at him strangely, The rest of the video just shows shots of Khalid in a desert, in a dark room around the swimming pool and driving around in his car.

== Remix ==
Three remixes have been released. The first one, the official remix featuring Lil Wayne and Kehlani was released on March 17, 2017. Another remix featuring Little Simz was released on January 26, 2017. The third remix featuring Jorja Smith and Wretch 32 was released on February 9, 2018.

== Track listing ==
- Digital download
1. ”Location” (Remix) (featuring Lil Wayne and Kehlani) – 4:38
- Digital download
1. ”Location” (London Remix) (featuring Little Simz) – 4:05
- Digital download
1. ”Location” (Remix) (featuring Jorja Smith and Wretch 32) – 3:29

== Charts ==
=== Weekly charts ===
Chart (2016–2017)	Peak position
Australia (ARIA)	39
Belgium (Ultratip Bubbling Under Flanders)	16
Belgium (Ultratip Bubbling Under Wallonia)	34
Canada Hot 100 (Billboard)	48
Czech Republic Singles Digital (ČNS IFPI)	52
Ireland (IRMA)	77
Netherlands (Single Top 100)	78
New Zealand (Recorded Music NZ)	11
Philippines (Philippine Hot 100)	12
Portugal (AFP)	41
Slovakia Singles Digital (ČNS IFPI)	47
Switzerland (Schweizer Hitparade)	76
UK Singles (Official Charts)	67
US Billboard Hot 100	16
US Hot R&B/Hip-Hop Songs (Billboard)	8
US Pop Airplay (Billboard)	24
US Rhythmic Airplay (Billboard)	4

=== Year-end charts ===
Chart (2017)	Position
New Zealand (Recorded Music NZ)	10
Portugal (AFP)	96
US Billboard Hot 100	21
US Hot R&B/Hip-Hop Songs (Billboard)	22
US Rhythmic (Billboard)	31
Chart (2018)	Position
Portugal (AFP)	136

== Certifications ==
Region	Certification	Certified units/sales
Australia (ARIA)	5× Platinum	350,000^{‡}
Brazil (Pro-Música Brasil)	2× Platinum	120,000^{‡}
Canada (Music Canada)	8× Platinum	640,000^{‡}
Denmark (IFPI Danmark)	Platinum	90,000^{‡}
France (SNEP)	Gold	100,000^{‡}
Germany (BVMI)	Gold	200,000^{‡}
Italy (FIMI)	Gold	25,000^{‡}
Mexico (AMPROFON)	3× Platinum	180,000^{‡}
Netherlands (NVPI)	Platinum	40,000^{‡}
New Zealand (RMNZ)	7× Platinum	210,000^{‡}
Norway (IFPI Norway)	Gold	30,000^{‡}
Poland (ZPAV)	Platinum	20,000^{‡}
Spain (Promusicae)	Gold	30,000^{‡}
Sweden (GLF)	Gold	20,000^{‡}
Switzerland (IFPI Switzerland)	Platinum	30,000^{‡}
United Kingdom (BPI)	2× Platinum	1,200,000^{‡}
United States (RIAA)	Diamond	10,000,000^{‡}
^{‡} Sales+streaming figures based on certification alone.
