= My Bad (song) =

Promotional single by Khalid

from the album Free Spirit
- Released: March 7, 2019
- Genre: Pop
- Length: 2:43
- Label: RCA
- Songwriters: Khalid Robinson; Dernst "D'Mile" Emile II
- Producer: D'Mile

"My Bad" is a song by American singer Khalid, released as a promotional single on March 7, 2019, along with the pre-order of his second studio album Free Spirit. The song was called an "apology track", with Khalid saying sorry for not replying to a person's text.

== Charts ==
=== Weekly charts ===
Chart (2019)	Peak position
Australia (ARIA)	14
Canada (Canadian Hot 100)	29
Czech Republic (Singles Digitál Top 100)	48
Denmark (Tracklisten)	28
Ireland (IRMA)	16
Lithuania (AGATA)	17
Netherlands (Single Top 100)	82
New Zealand (Recorded Music NZ)	10
Portugal (AFP)	53
Singapore (RIAS)	27
Slovakia (Singles Digitál Top 100)	34
Sweden (Sverigetopplistan)	96
Switzerland (Schweizer Hitparade)	75
UK Singles (OCC)	32
UK Hip Hop/R&B (OCC)	34
US Billboard Hot 100	55
US Hot R&B/Hip-Hop Songs (Billboard)	19

=== Year-end charts ===
Chart (2019)	Position
US Hot R&B Songs (Billboard)	37

== Certifications ==
Region	Certification	Certified units/sales
Australia (ARIA)	Platinum	70,000^{‡}
Brazil (Pro-Música Brasil)	Gold	20,000^{‡}
Canada (Music Canada)	Platinum	80,000^{‡}
New Zealand (RMNZ)	Platinum	30,000^{‡}
United States (RIAA)	Platinum	1,000,000^{‡}
^{‡} Sales+streaming figures based on certification alone.
