= Hangman (game) =

Word game

Example game in which the letters A and N but not the whole word HANGMAN were guessed – incorrect guesses are noted at the bottom

Hangman is a guessing game for two or more players. One player thinks of a word, phrase, or sentence and the other(s) tries to guess it by suggesting letters or numbers within a certain number of guesses. Originally a paper-and-pencil game, there are also electronic versions.

== History ==
Though the origins of the game are unknown, a variant is mentioned in a book of children's games assembled by Alice Gomme in 1894 called Birds, Beasts, and Fishes. This version lacks the image of a hanged man, instead relying on keeping score as to the number of attempts it took each player to fill in the blanks.

A version which incorporated hanging imagery was described in a 1902 article in The Philadelphia Inquirer, which stated that it was popular at "White Cap" parties where guests would wear "white peaked caps with masks".

== Overview ==
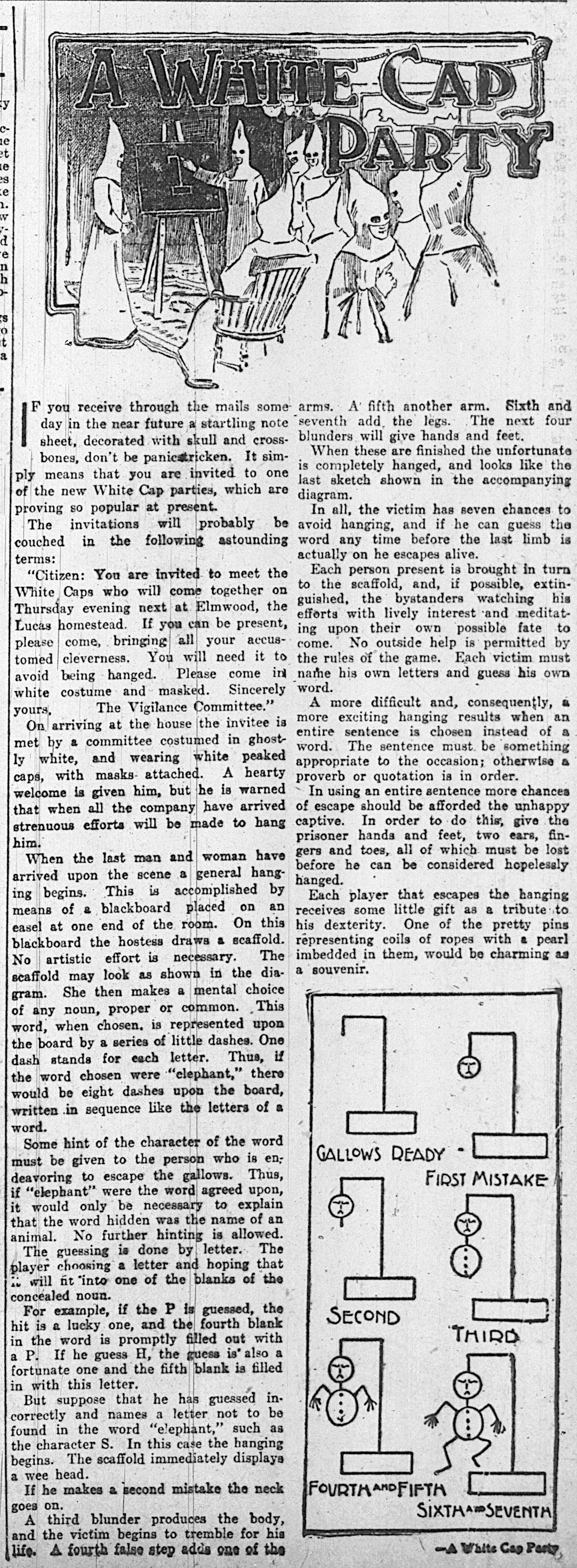
1902 article in the Philadelphia Inquirer about a hangman-themed children's party

The word to guess is represented by a row of dashes representing each letter or number of the word. Rules may permit or forbid proper nouns (such as names, places, or brands) or other types of words (such as slang). If the guessing player suggests a letter which occurs in the word, the other player writes it in all its correct positions. If the suggested letter does not occur in the word, the other player adds (or alternatively, removes) one element of a hanged stick figure as a tally mark. Generally, the game ends once the word is guessed, or if the stick figure is complete—signifying that all guesses have been used.

The player guessing the word may, at any time, attempt to guess the whole word. If the word is correct, the game is over and the guesser wins. Otherwise, the other player may choose to penalize the guesser by adding an element to the diagram. If the guesser makes enough incorrect guesses to allow the other player to complete the diagram, the guesser loses. However, the guesser can also win by guessing all the letters that appear in the word, thereby completing the word, before the diagram is completed.

== Variants ==
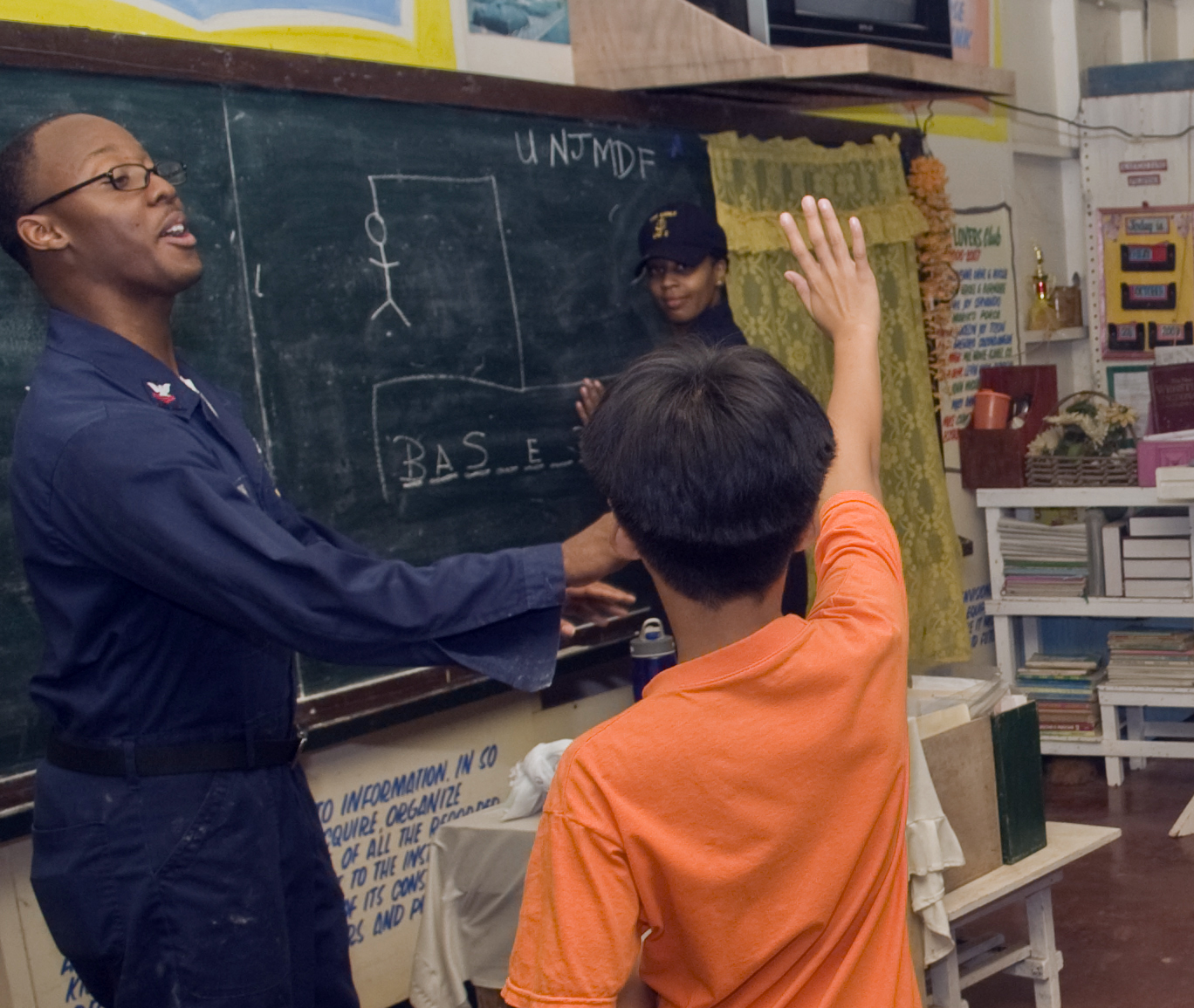
A classroom game of hangman

As the name of the game suggests, the diagram is designed to look like a hanging man. This has led to some controversy. In situations where drawing a public execution may not be advisable, alternative methods to keep track of the number of incorrect guesses can be used, such as crossing apples off of a tree or removing slices of a pie.

Some modifications to gameplay (house rules) to increase the difficulty level are sometimes implemented, such as limiting guesses on high-frequency consonants and vowels. Another alternative is to give the definition of the word; this can be used to facilitate the learning of a foreign language.

How many incorrect guesses are allowed in the game can also be modified. This can be done by adding extra elements to the stick figure, like a face or shoes, or by first drawing elements of the gallows for every mistake before starting to draw the stick figure.

== Strategy ==
The fact that the twelve most commonly occurring letters in the English language are e-t-a-o-i-n-s-h-r-d-l-u (from most to least), along with other letter-frequency lists, are used by the guessing player to increase the odds when it is their turn to guess. On the other hand, the same lists can be used by the puzzle setter to stump their opponent by choosing a word that deliberately avoids common letters (e.g., rhythm, zephyr, qi, nth) or one that contains rare letters (e.g., jazz).

Another common strategy is to guess vowels first, as English only has five vowels (a, e, i, o, and u, while y may sometimes, but rarely, be used as a vowel) and almost every word has at least one.

According to a 2010 study conducted by Jon McLoone for Wolfram Research, the most difficult words to guess include jazz, buzz, hajj, faff, fizz, fuzz and variations of these.

== Derivations ==
The American game show Wheel of Fortune was inspired by Hangman. Merv Griffin conceived of the show after recalling long car trips as a child, on which he and his sister played the game.

Brazil also had a show in the 1960s and again from 2012 to 2013 called Let's Play Hangman, hosted by Silvio Santos. Brazil would later get its own version of Wheel of Fortune, running from 1980 to 1993, again from 2003 to 2012 (during which the new Let's Play Hangman aired), and again since 2013 to the present. These shows were also hosted by Santos.

== See also ==
- Wordle
