= English words without vowels =

English orthography typically represents vowel sounds with the five conventional vowel letters ⟨a, e, i, o, u⟩. The letter ⟨y⟩ is largely recognized as being a vowel in specific contexts, though often disregarded when talking about vowelless words, which typically focus on the absence of the main five. A word with ⟨y⟩, but no other vowel letters, may thus be considered vowelless in this context. To a lesser degree, the letter ⟨w⟩ can act as a vowel in a narrow subset of loanwords.

Outside of abbreviations, there are a handful of words in English that do not have vowels, either because the vowel sounds are not written with vowel letters or because the words themselves are pronounced without vowel sounds.

== Words without written vowels ==
There are very few lexical words (that is, not counting interjections) without vowel letters. The longest such lexical word is tsktsks, pronounced /ˌtɪskˈtɪsks/. The mathematical expression nth /ˈɛnθ/, as in delighted to the nth degree, is in fairly common usage. Another mathematical term without vowel letters is ln, the natural logarithm. A more obscure example is rng /ˈrʌŋ/, derived from ring by deleting the letter ⟨i⟩.

=== Words from other languages ===
In the Middle English period, there were no standard spellings, but ⟨w⟩ was sometimes used to represent either a vowel or a consonant sound in the same way that Modern English does with ⟨y⟩, particularly during the 14th and 15th centuries. This vocalic ⟨w⟩ generally represented /uː/, as in wss ("use"). However at that time the form ⟨w⟩ was still sometimes used to represent a digraph ⟨uu⟩ (see W), not as a separate letter. In modern Welsh, "W" is simply a single letter which often represents a vowel sound. Thus words borrowed from Welsh may use ⟨w⟩ this way, such as:

- The crwth (pronounced /ˈkrʊθ/ or /ˈkruːθ/, also spelled cruth in English) is a Welsh musical instrument similar to the violin.

He intricately rhymes, to the music of crwth and pibgorn.

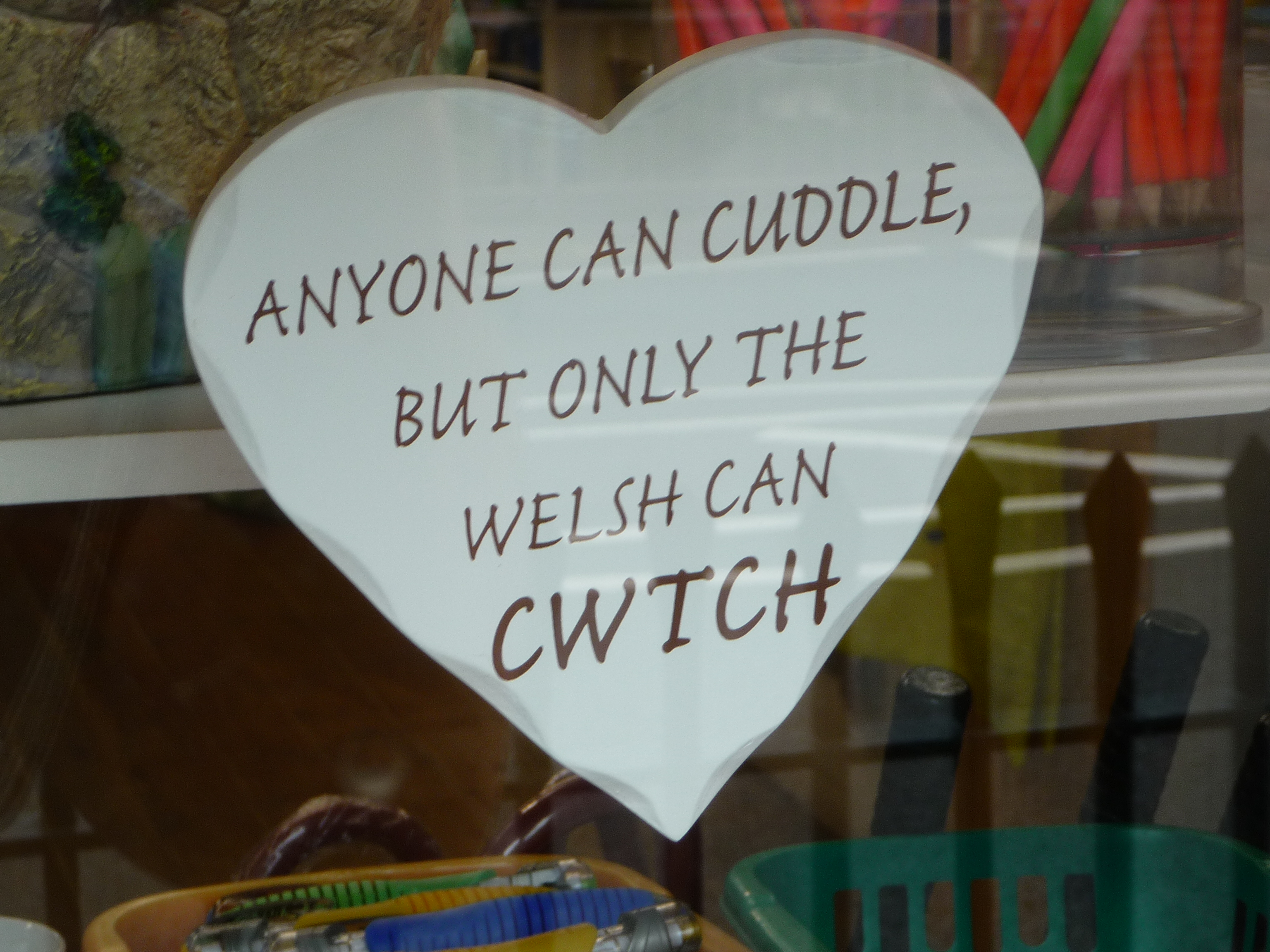
A heart-shaped shop sign stating "Anybody can cuddle but only the Welsh can cwtch"

- cwtch (a hiding place or cubby hole) is also from Welsh (albeit a recent word influenced by English, and used almost exclusively in the variant of English spoken in Wales, not in standard English), and crwth and cwtch are the longest English dictionary words without ⟨a, e, i, o, u, y⟩ according to Collins Dictionary.
- A cwm (pronounced /ˈkuːm/) is used in English in a technical geographical or mountaineering context to mean a deep hollow in a mountainous area, usually with steep edges on some sides, like a corrie or cirque, such as the Western Cwm of Mount Everest. It is also sometimes used, by way of more recent borrowing from Welsh, in a more general sense of a valley. The spellings coombe, combe, coomb, and comb come from the Old English cumb, which appears either to be a much earlier borrowing from a predecessor of modern Welsh, or to have an even earlier origin, given that there was an Ancient Greek word κὑμβη (kumbē) meaning a hollow vessel. In English literature, one can find the spellings combe (as in Ilfracombe and Castle Combe), coomb (as in J. R. R. Tolkien) or comb (as in Alfred, Lord Tennyson).

=== Onomatopoeia ===
There are also numerous vowel-less interjections and onomatopoeia found more or less frequently, including brr or brrr, bzzt, grrr, hm, hmm, mm, mmm, mhmm, sksksksk, pfft, pht, phpht, psst, sh, shh, zzz. Many of these words feature continuant consonants, which make up for the lack of vowels. The status of whether onomatopoeia are truly words is disputed, though officially, they are in fact words.

=== Proper names ===
Vowelless proper names from other languages, such as the East-Asian surname Ng, may retain their conventional spelling, even if they are pronounced with vowels. Ng in particular can be pronounced a variety of ways depending on the person, often without a vowel sound (in the case of it being pronounced /m/), and sometimes with. The name Brynn is a different example, as it contains a vowel sound though spelled with ⟨y⟩. From Greek, names containing upsilon (Υ) may be Romanized with ⟨y⟩, resulting in names like Nyx and Styx.

=== Alphabetical list of words devoid of A, E, I, O, and U ===
Some of these are onomatopoeia, some promoted by comic magazines (see above). Many others are derived from other languages, most commonly Greek, e.g. glyph (Greek), skyr (Icelandic), and fyrd (Anglo-Saxon). Names are excluded from the list.

Words styled in bold indicate words that do not contain Y or W. Words labelled in yellow indicate a word that does not contain a vowel sound in GA English.

Word	Definition
**brr(r)**	i. Expresses a feeling of cold.
by(s)	p. Near; through means of. n. Plural of "bye."
byrl(s)	v. Alternate form of "birle."
**bzzt**	Onomatopoeia for electricity.
chynd	a. Cut into chines for cooking.
cly	n. Pocket.
crwth(s)	n. A stringed instrument.
cry	v. Yelp.
crypt(s)	n. A cave.
cwm(s)	n. A valley.
cwtch	n. A cubbyhole; a display of affection.
cyst(s)	n. A growth of tissue.
dry(ly)(s)	a. Void of moisture. n. (Plural "drys") Prohibitionist.
fly	v. Move through air.
flyby(s)	n. An act of flying by something.
fry	v. Cook in oil.
fy	i. Alternate of "fie;" Expresses disgust.
fyrd(s)	n. An army.
ghyll(s)	n. A ravine.
glycyl(s)	n. The radical extracted from glycine.
glyph(s)	n. A letter or symbol.
**grr(r)(l)(s)**	Onomatopoeia of a growl.
gym(s)	n. A room for exercising.
gyp(s)	n. Short for "gypsy."
gyppy	n. Slang for "gypsy."
gypsy	n. A Romani person.
**hm(m)(m)**	i. Expresses thought.
**hmph**	i. Expresses indignation.
hwyl(s)	n. Welsh chanting.
hymn(s)	n. A biblical song.
hyp(s)	n. Short for Hypochondria.
jynx	n. A wryneck.
ky	n. Alternate of "kye."
Kyrgyz	a. Pertaining to Kyrgyzstan.
lymph(s)	n. A sore's discharge.
lynch	v. To execute extrajudicially.
lynx	n. A big cat.
**mhmm**	i. Yes.
**mm(m)**	i. Express gustation.
my	d. First-person singular possessive.
myrrh(s)	n. A gum-resin.
myth(y)(s)	n. An unproven belief.
**nth**	a. Occurring at position n.
ny(s)	a. Obsolete spelling of "nigh."
nymph(ly)(s)	n. A female nature deity.
**pfft**	i. Express doubt.
**phpht**	Onomatopoeia; alternate of "pht"
**pht**	Onomatopoeia of a fart.
ply(s)	n. A "half-turn" in a two-player game.
pry	v. To use leverage to open.
**pspsps**	i. Used to call a cat.
**psst**	i. Used to slyly grab attention.
psych(s)	n. A psychiatrist.
pwn(s)	n. Slang for "own;" a triumph.
pygmy	n. An African ethnic group.
pyx	n. A small, round box.
rhythm(s)	n. Beat of a song.
**rng**	n. An algebraic structure.
rynd(s)	n. A type of iron crossing.
scry	v. To magically tell someone's fortune.
**sh(h)**	i. Used to silence someone.
shy(ly)	a. Lacking confidence.
**sksksk(sk)**	i. Indicates playful nonsense.
sky	n. The atmosphere.
skyr	n. A dairy product similar to yogurt.
sly(ly)	a. Cunning.
spry(ly)	a. Nimble.
spy	v. To seek and to spot.
sty	n. A pigpen.
stymy	n. Alternate of "stymie."
swy	n. A two-shilling coin.
sybyzgy	n. A stick-like, Kyrgyz musical instrument.
sylph(s)	n. An air spirit.
syn	a. That has a torsion angle between 0° and 90°.
sync(h)(s)	v. To synchronize.
synth(s)	n. A synthesizer.
syzygy	n. An alignment of three celestial bodies.
thy	d. Possessive form of "thou."
thymy	a. Having the flavor of thyme.
try	v. To attempt.
tryp	n. Abbreviation of "tryptophan."
tryst(s)	n. An affair.
**tsk(s)**	i. Express disapproval.
**tsktsk(s)**	i. Elongation of "tsk."
**tss**	Onomatopoeia of cymbals.
twp	a. Foolish.
twyndyllyng(s)	n. Old English term for "twinling."
tyg(s)	n. A drinking cup.
tyyn	n. Currency of Kyrgyzstan and Uzbekistan. (1/100 som)
vly	n. A marsh
why(s)	For what purpose.
wry(ly)	a. Twisted.
wych	n. A well
wyn(s)	n. Alternate of "wynn."
wynd(s)	n. A narrow lane between houses.
wynn(s)	n. A letter of Old English; "ƿ."
xylyl(s)	n. The radical extracted from Xylene.
xyst(s)	n. The covered portico of a gymnasium.
xyzzy	A word used as a dummy placeholder.
**zzz**	Onomatopoeia for sleeping.

== Words without vowel sounds ==
Weak forms of function words may be realized without vowel sounds, as in I can go [aɪ kŋ̍ ˈɡoʊ] and I must sell [aɪ ms̩ ˈsɛl]. Some of these forms are reflected in orthography as contractions, such as 's, 'll, 'd, and n't.

== See also ==
- Wiktionary: List of words that comprise a single sound
- Disemvoweling – Removal of vowels from a text
- Words without vowels in other languages
