= Cwtch =

Welsh word for an embrace or hug associated with comfort and safety

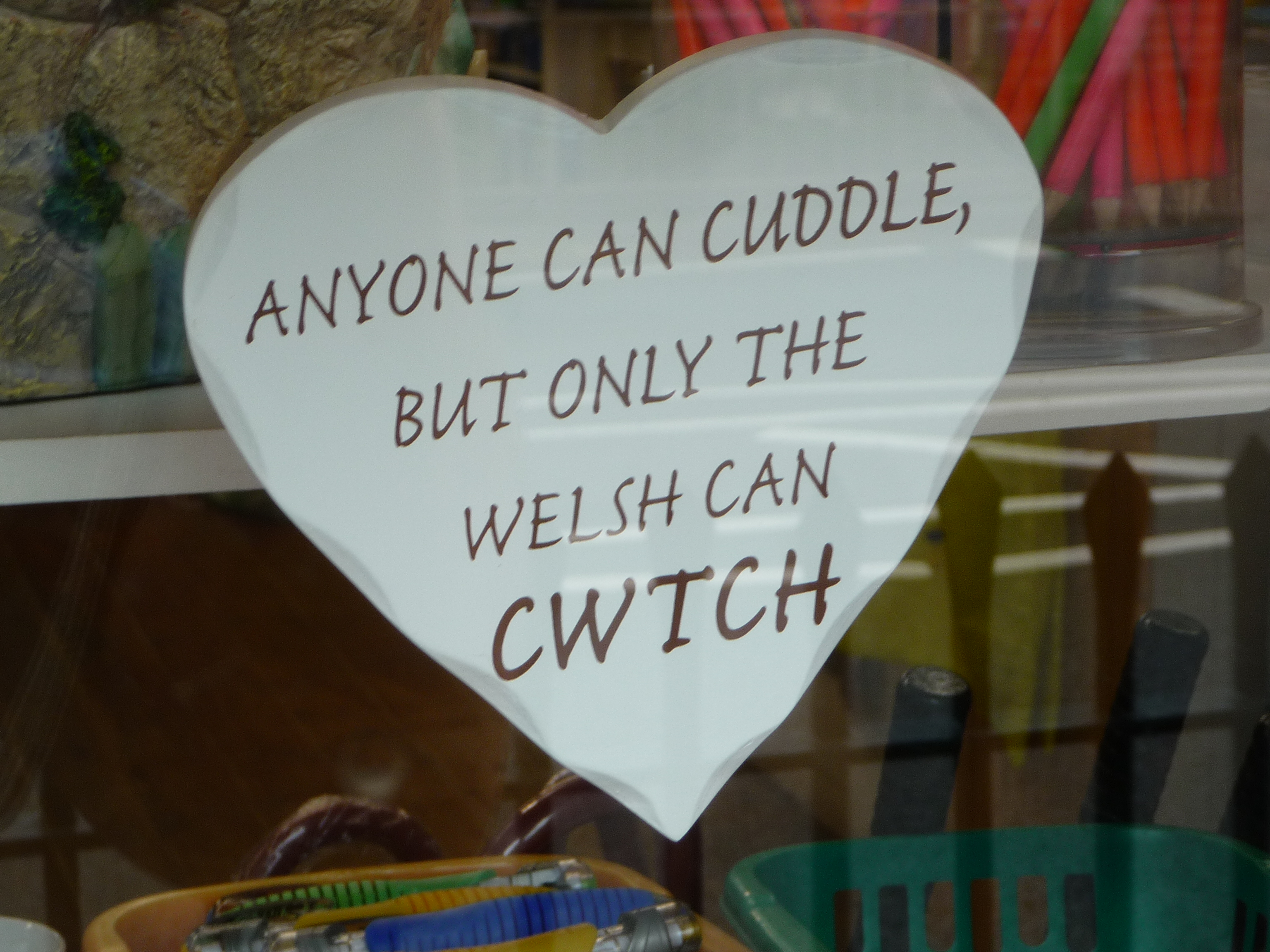
The word is frequently used on souvenirs, T-shirts and in gift shops in Wales.

Cwtch (Welsh pronunciation: [kʊtʃ]) is a Welsh-language and Welsh-English dialect word meaning a cuddle or embrace with a sense of offering warmth and safety. Often considered untranslatable, the word originated as a colloquialism in South Wales, but is today seen as uniquely representative of all Wales, Welsh national identity, and Welsh culture.

== Etymology ==
As there are no recognised cognates in the other Celtic languages, cwtch (also spelled as cwtsh and its earlier form cwts) is believed to be a loanword.

One etymology suggests that the word came into Welsh language following the Norman invasion of Wales. The Old French verb coucher can mean "to lay (something) down", with a related noun couche denoting a resting or hiding place. If this derivation is correct, then the word ultimately derives from the Latin collocare, meaning place together. The Norman word also gave rise to the Middle English noun couch, but the verb form may have been the more popular usage among Welsh speakers.

== Definition and translation ==
The word has been described as "impossible to translate", but concise and short English dictionaries often equate cwtch to words like cuddle, snuggle, or hug. These translations however are considered synonymous at best and not effective translations or equivalent terms. None of the common English synonyms contain the word's evocation of a "safe place", but that aspect has been persevered in a secondary definition of the word in English as a "hiding place, recess, or cubbyhole".

This difficulty in translation and definition parallels another Welsh word, hiraeth, which often loses its original meaning of safety, childhood, or an idealized past.

== History ==
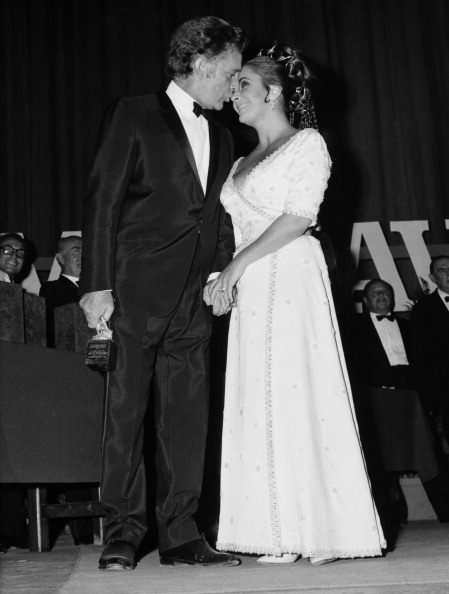
"I just want to go and cwtch him." - Elizabeth Taylor's quote was one of the first notable uses of the word by a non-Welsh person.

The word is not recorded in English until the late nineteenth century (despite being colloquially popular among Welsh speakers for some time). One of the most notable uses of the word in the English language was by Elizabeth Taylor, who said of her Welsh husband Richard Burton, "I just want to go and cwtch him".

During the late twentieth century, the word became heavily associated with Wales and Welsh people, but in writing, the term was still most frequently found in texts and passages associated with a south Wales dialect. By the twenty-first century, the word had gained a level of understanding outside of Wales, and was popular enough in British English to be added to the Concise Oxford English Dictionary in 2005.

=== COVID-19 Pandemic ===
Avoiding another sweaty handshake with professional colleagues is certainly no great loss, but the ban on simple physical rituals like cwtching friends and family is.
Laura McAllister on how the Covid restrictions stopped the "physical ritual" of cwtching.

During the COVID-19 pandemic in Wales, the word was often used in discussing the Welsh Government's social restrictions. In March 2020 Dawn Bowden AM stated that she was "feeling hugely emotional that I have no idea when I'm going to be able to cwtch my six-month-old grandson again." The Llywydd of the Senedd, Elin Jones ended the final Plenary session of the fifth Senedd (which was conducted virtually due to the government's own restrictions) by saying "I give you all a virtual cwtch, and good evening." In criticising the Welsh Government's restrictions, Fay Jones the Conservative MP for Brecon and Radnorshire became the first person to use the word in the British Parliament.

London-based news services also used the word in reporting the lifting of the Welsh restrictions for a wider readership across the United Kingdom, describing the restrictions as a "ban on having a cwtch".

== Popularity ==
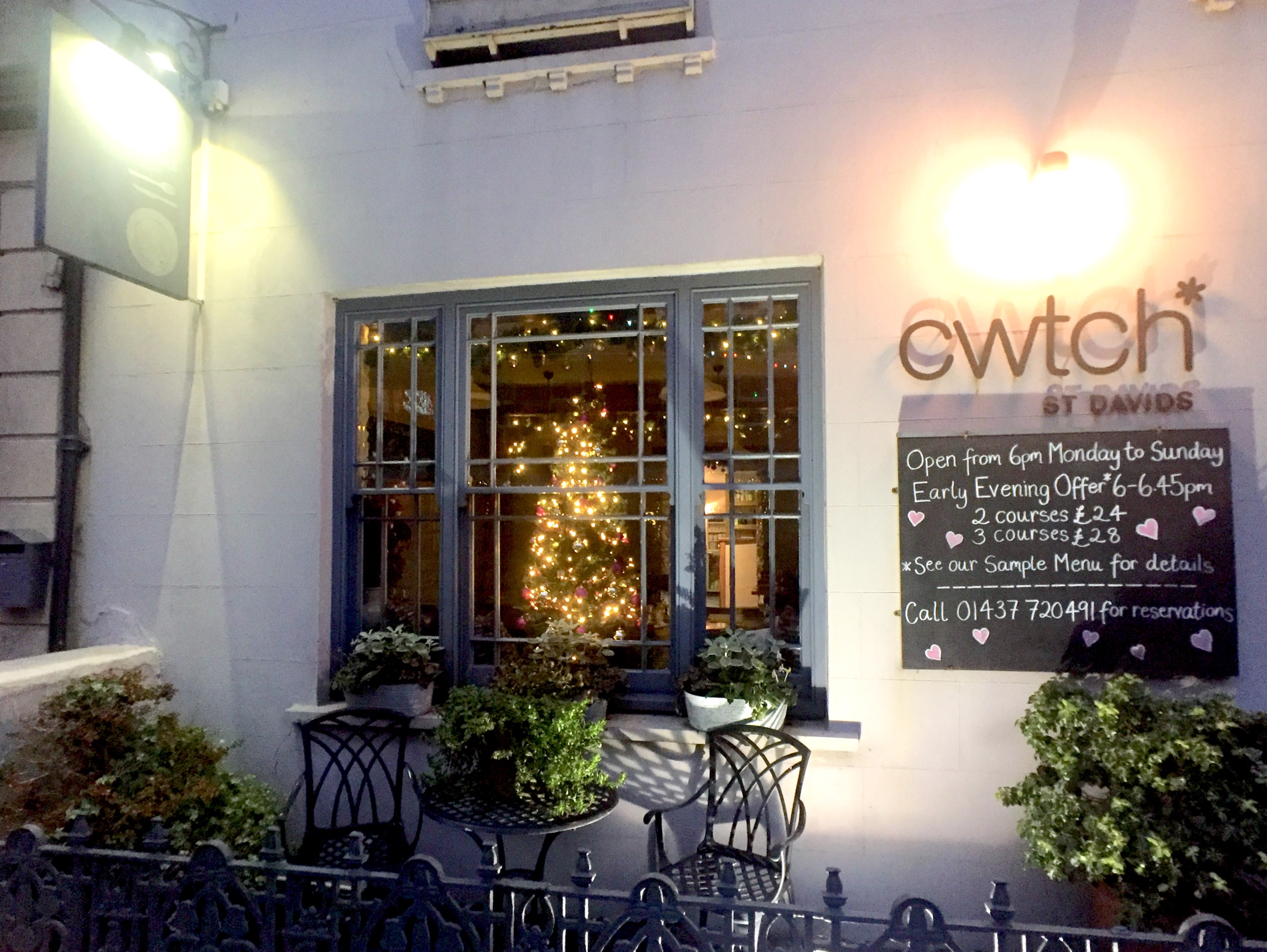
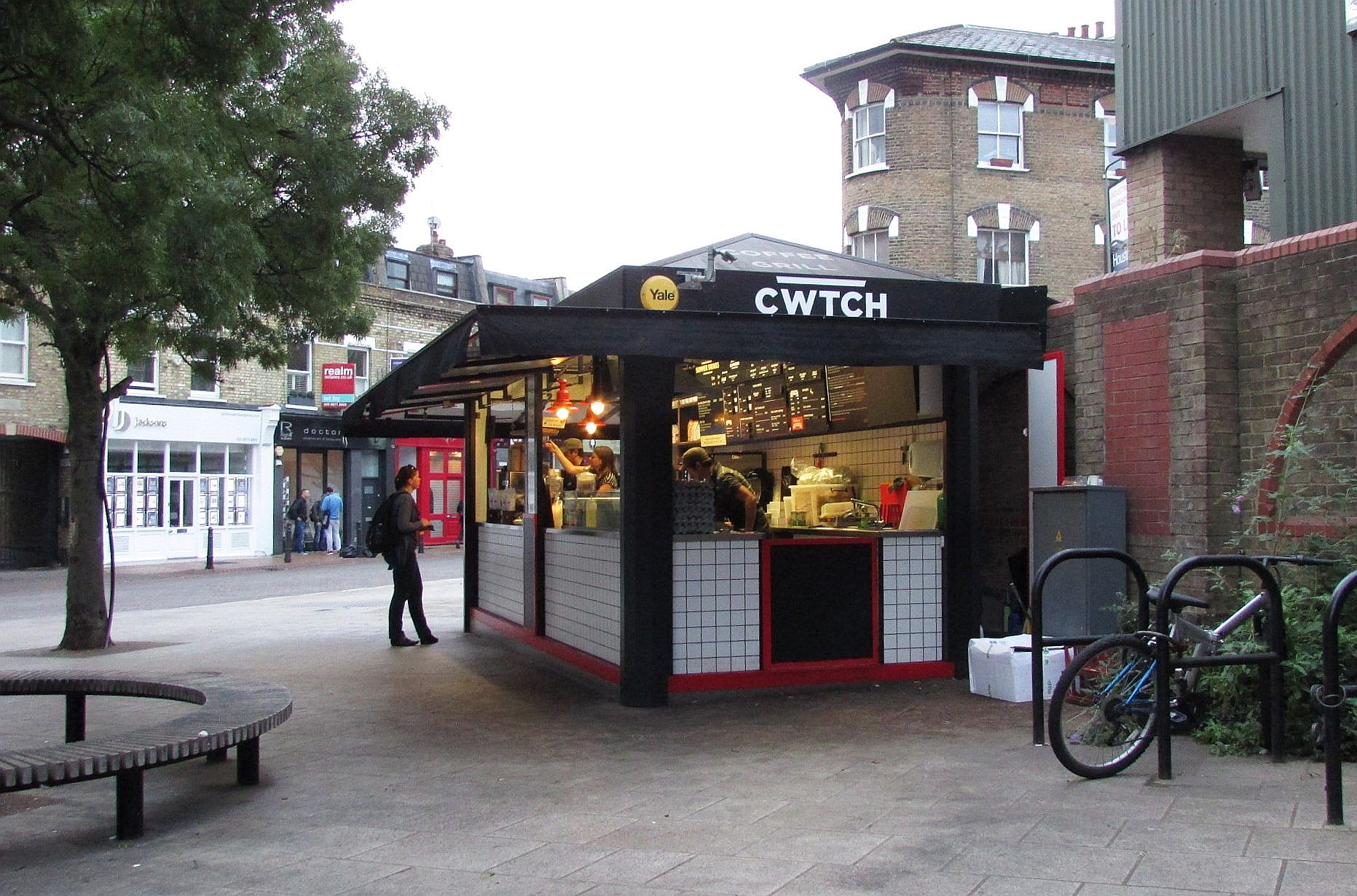
Businesses using the name Cwtch in St Davids, Wales and Wandsworth, England.

The word is seen as emblematic of the sociolinguistics of Wales, being a commonly understood indicator of Welsh identity and culture both inside and outside the nation. In 2007, cwtch was described as "the nation's favourite word", following a UK poll.

A common explanation for the word's appeal is that it fills a semantic gap, articulating an aspect of Welsh life that is not captured within the common lexicon of British English. The word has been described as linking an association with loved ones with the nation of Wales, giving a unique understanding of national identity. This popularity has, however, led to the word's commodification, with marketing campaigns, retailers and designers all using the word to emphasise, simulate or caricature Welsh culture. Despite this, the word still has very strong positive connotations for both Welsh and non-Welsh people.

== See also ==
- hiraeth, a Welsh word meaning longing for a past that no longer exists, also considered untranslatable.
- hygge, a Danish and Norwegian word meaning comfortable conviviality, also considered untranslatable.
