= Disemvoweling =

Removal of vowels from a text

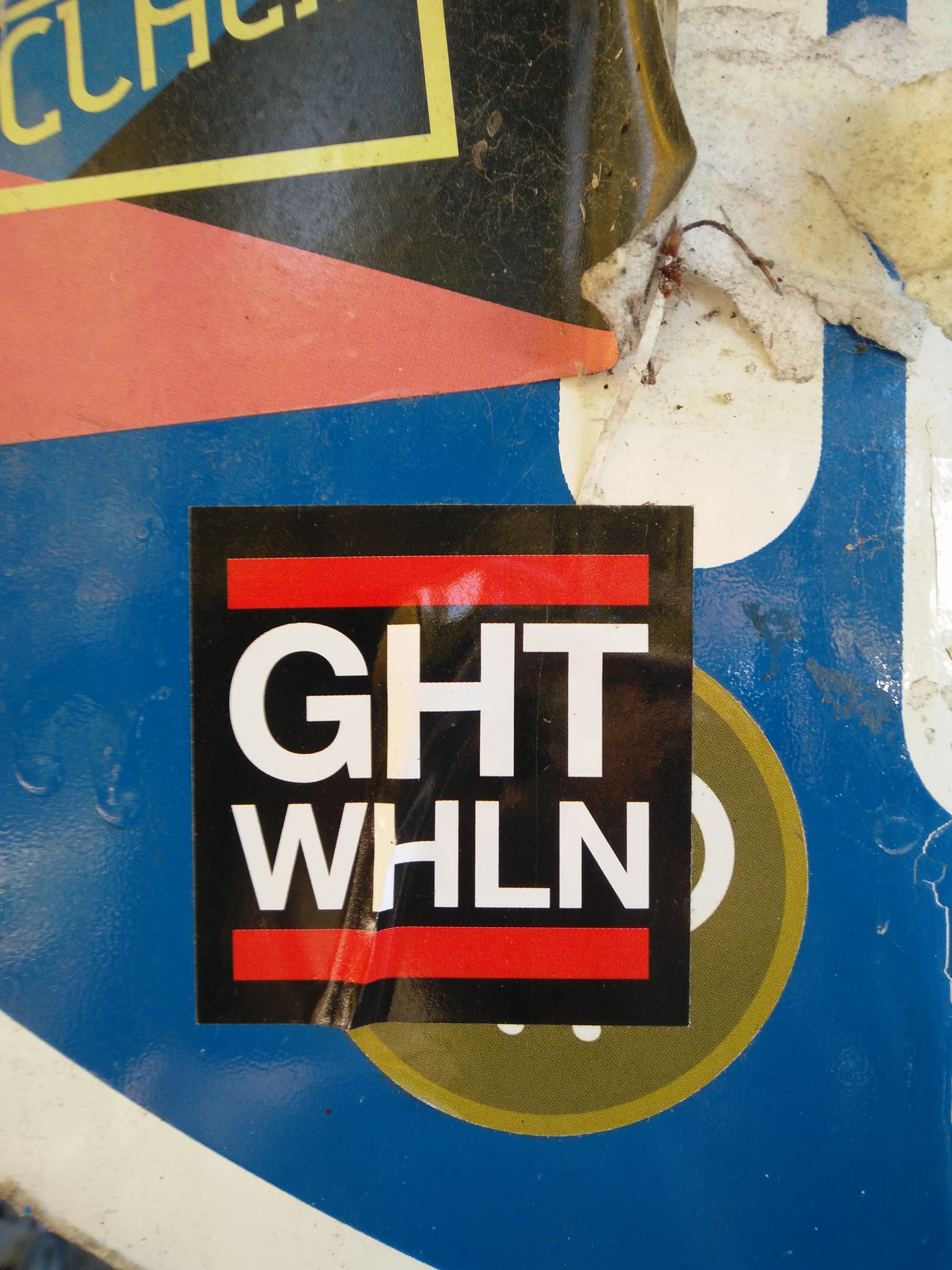
Sticker "Ght whln" using the Run-DMC logo design: disemvoweling of German slogan "Geht wählen" ("Go vote")

Disemvoweling, disemvowelling (British and Commonwealth English), or disemvowelment is writing a piece of text with all the vowel letters removed. Disemvoweling is often used in band and company names. It used to be a common feature of SMS language where space was costly.

== Etymology ==
The word disemvowel is a pun and portmanteau combining vowel and disembowel. One of the earliest attestations of the word dates back to the 1860s. The 1939 novel Finnegans Wake by James Joyce also uses it: "Secret speech Hazelton and obviously disemvowelled".

== Use as a moderation tool ==
A technique dubbed splat out was used by Usenet moderators to prevent flamewars, by substituting a "splat" (i.e., asterisk) for some letters, often the vowels, of highly charged words in postings. Examples include Nazi→N*z*, evolution→*v*l*t**n, gun control→g*n c*ntr*l. According to the Jargon File, "the purpose is not to make the word unrecognizable but to make it a mention rather than a use." The term "disemvoweling"—attested from 1990—was occasionally used for the splat-out of vowels.

Teresa Nielsen Hayden used the vowel-deletion technique in 2002 for internet forum moderation on her blog Making Light. This was termed disemvoweling by Arthur D. Hlavaty later in the same thread.

Nielsen Hayden joined the group blog Boing Boing as community manager in August 2007, when it re-enabled comments on its posts, and implemented disemvoweling. Gawker Media sites adopted disemvoweling as a moderation tool in August 2008. On 30 October 2008, Time magazine listed disemvoweling as #42 of their "Top 50 Inventions of 2008".

Xeni Jardin, co-editor of Boing Boing, said of the practice, "the dialogue stays, but the misanthrope looks ridiculous, and the emotional sting is neutralized." Also, Boing Boing producers claim that disemvoweling sends a clear message to internet forums as to types of behavior that are unacceptable.

After Jeff Bezos acquired The Washington Post in 2013, one of his ideas was to install a feature that allowed a reader to "disemvowel" an article they didn't enjoy, the idea being that another reader would have to pay to reinstate the vowels. Shailesh Prakash, the newspaper's chief product and technology officer, said "the idea didn't go far".

=== Criticism ===
In July 2008, New York Times reporter Noam Cohen criticized disemvoweling as a moderation tool, citing a June 2008 dispute about the deletion of all posts on Boing Boing that mentioned sex columnist Violet Blue. In the Boing Boing comment threads resulting from this controversy, Nielsen Hayden used the disemvoweling technique. Cohen noted that disemvoweling was "not quite censorship, but not quite unfettered commentary, either." A subsequent unsigned case study on online crisis communication asserted that "removing the vowels from participants' comments only increased the gulf between the editors and the community" during the controversy.

Matt Baumgartner, a blogger at the Albany Times Union, reported in August 2009 that the newspaper's lawyers had told him to stop disemvoweling comments.

=== Implementation ===
Nielsen Hayden originally disemvoweled postings manually, using Microsoft Word. Because the letter Y is sometimes a vowel and sometimes a consonant, there are a variety of ways to treat it. Nielsen Hayden's policy was never to remove Y, in order to maintain legibility.

The technique has been facilitated by plug-in filters to automate the process. The first, for MovableType, was written in 2002; others are available for WordPress and other content management systems.

In 2019, officials in Montgomery County, Maryland attempted to discourage street sign theft by removing the vowels from several frequently stolen signs throughout the county. Affected signs included "Stoner Drive", "Blunt Road", "Morningwood Drive", and "Terrapin Drive".

== Use in company and band names ==
Since the 2000s, various company and band names have been making use of full or partial disemvowelling, such as twttr (original name of Twitter), abrdn, BHLDN, Tumblr, Flickr, and Scribd. Artists and band names that use full or partial disemvowelling include Mstrkrft, ARTMS, MGMT, MSCHF, Mndsgn, MNDR, DNCE, Blk Jks, Sbtrkt, WSTRN, gnrlyhd, HMGNC, Strfkr, Kshmr, TNGHT, INXS, LNDN DRGS, LNZNDRF, JMSN, PVT, RDGLDGRN, xSDTRK, Dvsn, SWMRS and Dwntwn. Disemvoweling can be used due to copyright or search engine optimization reasons. For voice user interfaces, band and song names without vowels can be difficult to process.

== See also ==
- English words without vowels
- Vanity plate
- Abjad, a writing system similar to an alphabet that removes most or all vowels
