= Dwntwn =

American indie rock/pop band

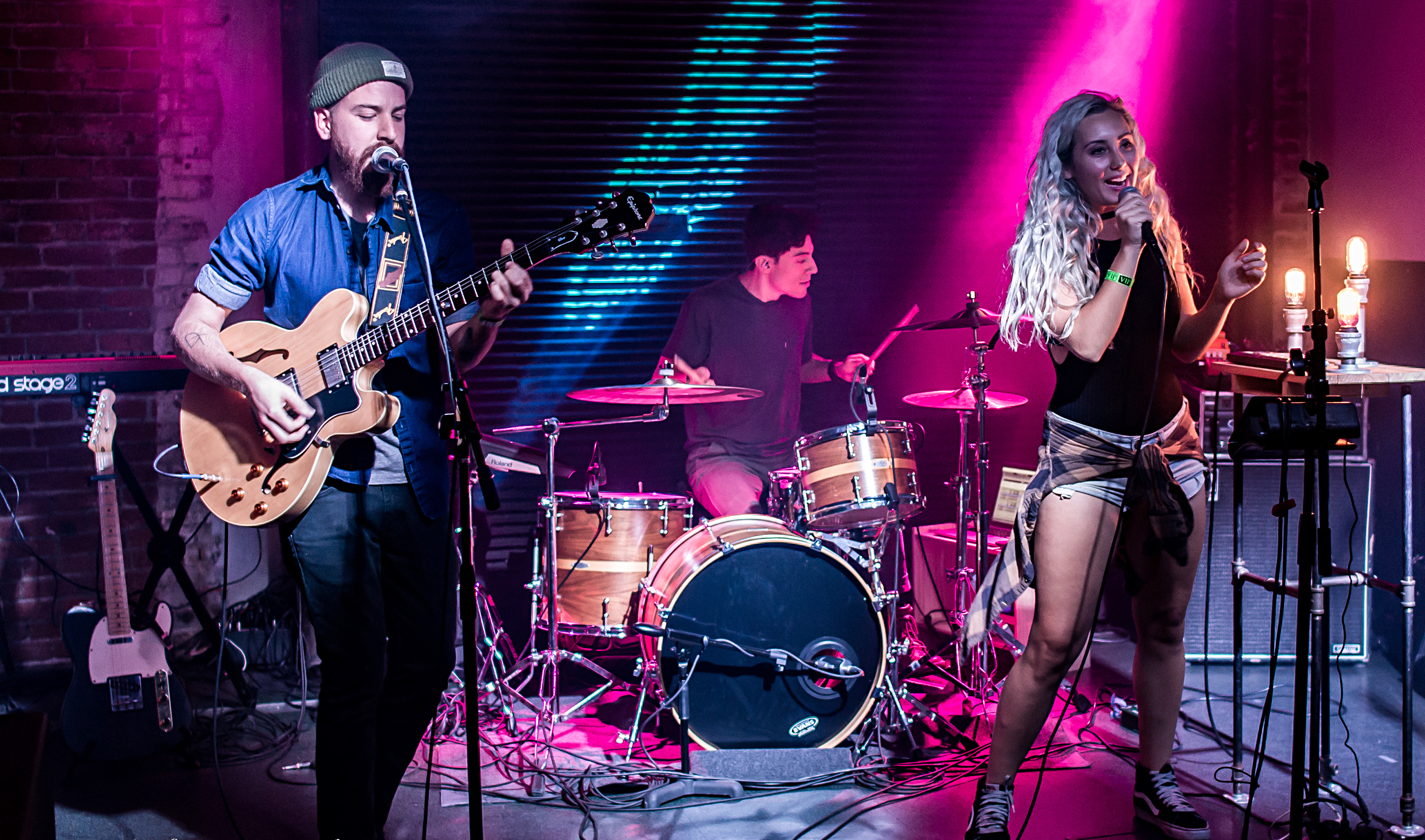
- Dwntwn performing in 2016

Background information
- Origin: Los Angeles, California, U.S.
- Genres: Indie rock, indie pop
- Years active: 2010–present
- Label: Jullian Records
- Members: Jamie Leffler; Robert Cepeda; Daniel Vanchieri; Chris Sanchez
- Website: dwntwnmusic.com

Dwntwn (pronounced "Downtown") is an American indie rock/pop band from Los Angeles. Formed in 2010, members include Jamie Leffler, Robert Cepeda, and Daniel Vanchieri. Their self-titled EP, "DWNTWN" was released April 29, 2014.

== History ==
It was after a break-up with Cepeda's brother that Jamie Leffler and Robert Cepeda formed the band, starting as a duo. Staying home to write songs and work on their sounds, the two spent years perfecting their music. Soon Dwntwn became a four piece band as their sound evolved.

In 2012, French tastemaker label, Kitsuné debuted Dwntwn's first single, "See My Eyes", to critical acclaim. This track was added to one of the label's compilation albums. Then in 2013, Dwntwn was again featured on another compilation album with Giraffage and Jhameel on the track "Move Me". Each song reached #2 on Hype Machine's popular chart.

=== Red Room EP ===
The Red Room EP was released on November 13, 2012. This EP was noted for its heavy use of the synthesizer that really started to show the musical evolution of the group. This release led the music to be compared to Ellie Goulding, the soundtrack of the film Drive, Dev and Sia.

With the release of "Red Room", Dwntwn joined Capital Cities and Golden Field for a handful of tour dates.

=== Dwntwn EP to present ===
The group released their first single from the self-titled EP in February 2014. "Til Tomorrow" received attention from across the country and premiered on USA Today's website. In a review of the EP, it was stated that they are "seriously obsessed". with the band calling them the "LA blog version of Ellie Goulding.

In April, Dwntwn released their second single, "Missing You", written as a tribute to Leffler's late grandfather. The track debuted on Paste Magazine's website in anticipation of the EP's release later that month.

Dwntwn EP was released April 29, 2014, on Jullian Records.

== Discography ==
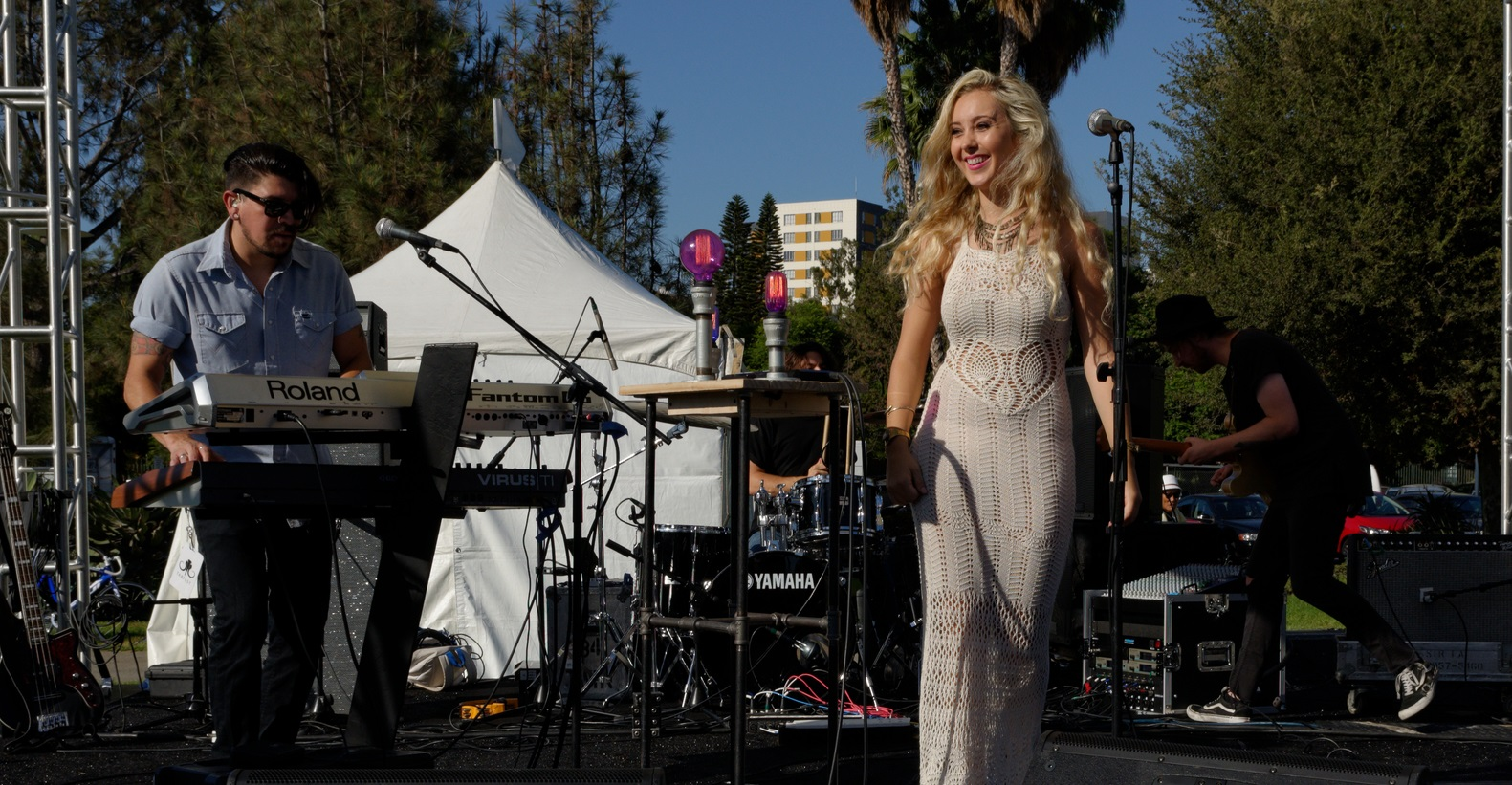
Performing in 2014

=== Extended plays ===
- Cowboys (2012)
- Red Room (2012)
- Dwntwn (2014)

=== Singles ===
- "See My Eyes" (2012)
- "Til Tomorrow" (February 2014)
- "Missing You" (April 2014)

=== Albums ===
- "Racing Time" (July 2017)
