= Khalid discography =

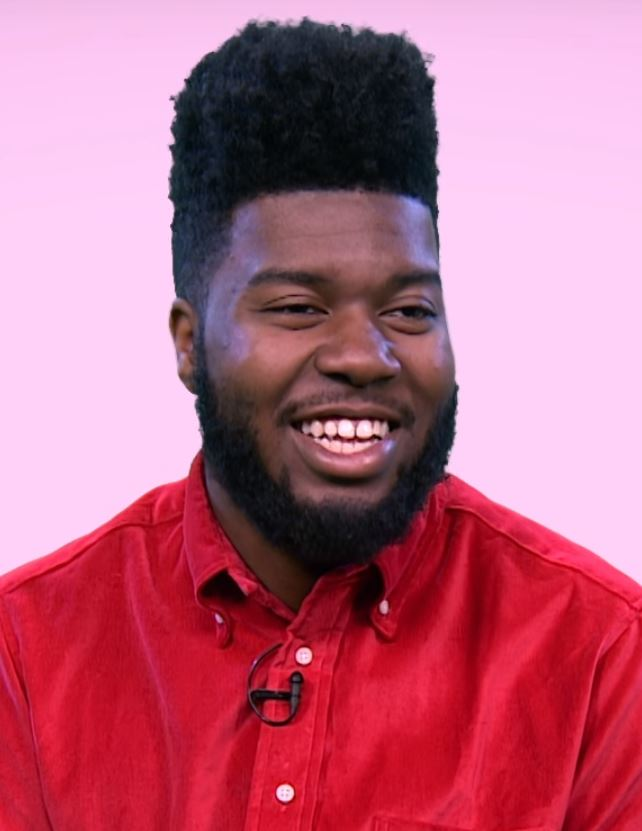
- Khalid in October 2017
- Studio albums: 4
- EPs: 1
- Singles: 45
- Promotional singles: 9
- Mixtapes: 1

American singer Khalid has released four studio albums, one mixtape, one extended play, 45 singles (including 15 as a featured artist), and nine promotional singles.

On March 3, 2017, Khalid released his debut studio album, American Teen. The album debuted and peaked at number four on the Billboard 200. It produced the top-20 singles, "Location" and "Young Dumb & Broke", which reached numbers 16 and 18 on the Billboard Hot 100, respectively. In 2018, he released a collaboration with Normani, "Love Lies", which reached number nine on the Hot 100. Later that year, he released a collaboration with Benny Blanco and Halsey, "Eastside", which also reached number nine on the Hot 100. On October 19, 2018, Khalid released his debut extended play, Suncity. The EP debuted and peaked at number eight on the Billboard 200. It produced the top-10 single, "Better", which charted at number eight on the Hot 100.

On April 5, 2019, Khalid released his second studio album, Free Spirit. The album debuted and peaked atop the Billboard 200, giving him his first chart-topping project. It produced the top-10 single, "Talk", which reached number three on the Billboard Hot 100. In 2020, he released a collaboration with Kane Brown and Swae Lee, "Be Like That", which reached number 19 on the Hot 100. On December 3, 2021, Khalid released his debut mixtape, Scenic Drive. The mixtape debuted and peaked at number 54 on the Billboard 200.

Khalid has also been featured on several songs that have received mainstream success. In 2017, he appeared alongside Alessia Cara on Logic's single, "1-800-273-8255", which reached number three on the Billboard Hot 100. Later that year, he was featured on Marshmello's single, "Silence", which charted at number 30 on the Hot 100. In 2019, he was featured on Ed Sheeran's single, "Beautiful People", which debuted and peaked at number 13 on the Hot 100.

Khalid's fourth studio album, After the Sun Goes Down, was released on October 10, 2025.

== Studio albums ==
List of studio albums, with selected details and peak chart positions
Title	Album details	Peak chart positions										Sales	Certifications
Title	Album details	US	US R&B/ HH	US R&B	AUS	CAN	DEN	NLD	NZ	SWE	UK	Sales	Certifications
American Teen	Released: March 3, 2017; Labels: Right Hand, RCA, Columbia; Formats: CD, LP, digital download, streaming	4	3	1	13	7	2	26	5	15	44	US: 147,000 (Note: United States sales figure for American Teen as of December 28, 2017.)	RIAA: 4× Platinum; ARIA: Platinum; BPI: Platinum; IFPI DEN: 3× Platinum; GLF: Gold; MC: 4× Platinum; RMNZ: 6× Platinum
Free Spirit	Released: April 5, 2019; Label: RCA; Formats: CD, LP, digital download, streaming	1	1	1	2	1	4	3	2	3	2	US: 226,000	RIAA: 2× Platinum; ARIA: Platinum; BPI: Gold; IFPI DEN: Platinum; MC: 2× Platinum; NVPI: Gold; RMNZ: 2× Platinum
Sincere	Released: August 2, 2024; Label: RCA; Formats: CD, LP, digital download, streaming	43	11	2	46	82	—	71	27	—	—		
After the Sun Goes Down	Released: October 10, 2025; Label: RCA; Formats: CD, LP, digital download, streaming	136	41	17	59	—	—	—	—	—	—		
"—" denotes a recording that did not chart or was not released in that territory.

== Mixtapes ==
Mixtape, with selected details and peak chart positions
Title	Details	Peak chart positions							
Title	Details	US	US R&B/ HH	US R&B	AUS	CAN	LIT	NZ	SWI
Scenic Drive	Released: December 3, 2021; Label: RCA; Formats: Digital download, streaming	54	24	8	62	51	96	37	94

== Extended plays ==
List of extended plays, with selected details and peak chart positions
Title	Details	Peak chart positions										Certifications
Title	Details	US	US R&B/ HH	US R&B	AUS	CAN	DEN	NLD	NZ	SWE	UK	Certifications
Suncity	Released: October 19, 2018; Label: RCA; Format: LP, digital download, streaming	8	5	1	9	6	2	10	11	3	20	BPI: Silver; IFPI DEN: Gold; MC: Platinum; RMNZ: Gold

== Singles ==
=== As lead artist ===
List of singles as lead artist, with selected chart positions, showing year released and album name
Title	Year	Peak chart positions										Certifications	Album
Title	Year	US	US R&B/ HH	US R&B	AUS	CAN	DEN	NLD	NZ	SWE	UK	Certifications	Album
"Location"	2016	16	8	2	39	48	—	78	11	— (Note: "Location" did not enter the Swedish Singellista Chart, but peaked at number 3 on the Swedish Heatseekers Chart.)	67	RIAA: Diamond; ARIA: 5× Platinum; BPI: 2× Platinum; GLF: Gold; IFPI DEN: Platinum; MC: 8× Platinum; NVPI: Platinum; RMNZ: 7× Platinum	American Teen
"Young Dumb & Broke"	2017	18	8	1	4	22	14	63	1	63	17	RIAA: Diamond; ARIA: 8× Platinum; BPI: 2× Platinum; GLF: Gold; IFPI DEN: 2× Platinum; MC: 9× Platinum; RMNZ: 7× Platinum	American Teen
"Saved"	2017	—	— (Note: "Saved" did not enter the Hot R&B/Hip-Hop Songs chart, but peaked at number four on the Bubbling Under R&B/Hip-Hop Singles chart.)	16	92	—	—	—	—	—	—	RIAA: 2× Platinum; ARIA: 2× Platinum; BPI: Silver; IFPI DEN: Platinum; MC: 2× Platinum; RMNZ: 2× Platinum	American Teen
"Love Lies" (with Normani)	2018	9	—	—	3	21	9	17	2	12	12	RIAA: 5× Platinum; ARIA: 5× Platinum; BPI: 2× Platinum; IFPI DEN: Platinum; GLF: Platinum; MC: 4× Platinum; RMNZ: 6× Platinum	Love, Simon
"Lovely" (with Billie Eilish)	2018	64	—	—	5	46	—	55	4	63	47	RIAA: Diamond; ARIA: 13× Platinum; BPI: 3× Platinum; IFPI DEN: 2× Platinum; GLF: 2× Platinum; MC: 4× Platinum; RMNZ: 9× Platinum	13 Reasons Why: Season 2
"OTW" (Note: The song is only included on the vinyl edition of the EP.) (with Ty Dolla Sign and 6lack)	2018	57	35	6	27	30	20	50	11	52	60	RIAA: 2× Platinum; ARIA: 3× Platinum; BPI: Gold; IFPI DEN: Platinum; GLF: Gold; MC: 2× Platinum; RMNZ: 3× Platinum	Suncity
"This Way" (with H.E.R.)	2018	—	—	20	—	—	—	—	— (Note: "This Way" did not enter the NZ Top 40 Singles Chart, but peaked at number five on the NZ Heatseeker Singles Chart.)	—	—	RIAA: Gold; RMNZ: Gold	Superfly
"Eastside" (with Benny Blanco and Halsey)	2018	9	—	—	2	6	2	21	1	7	1	RIAA: 6× Platinum; ARIA: 17× Platinum; BPI: 5× Platinum; GLF: Platinum; IFPI DEN: 3× Platinum; MC: 5× Platinum; RMNZ: 8× Platinum	Friends Keep Secrets
"Better"	2018	8	5	1	6	14	10	30	4	13	15	RIAA: 6× Platinum; ARIA: 8× Platinum; BPI: 2× Platinum; IFPI DEN: Platinum; GLF: Gold; MC: 7× Platinum; RMNZ: 8× Platinum	Suncity and Free Spirit
"Saturday Nights" (solo or remix with Kane Brown)	2019	57	21	4	27	31	30	61	8	77	31	RIAA: 4× Platinum; ARIA: 2× Platinum; BPI: Platinum; IFPI DEN: Platinum; MC: 4× Platinum; RMNZ: 4× Platinum	Suncity and Free Spirit
"Talk"	2019	3	2	1	4	14	9	19	1	32	9	RIAA: 7× Platinum; ARIA: 4× Platinum; BPI: Platinum; IFPI DEN: Platinum; MC: 5× Platinum; RMNZ: 5× Platinum	Free Spirit (Note: "Talk" also appears on Disclosure's third studio album, Energy (2020), with them also being credited as a co-lead artist.)
"Right Back" (solo or featuring A Boogie wit da Hoodie)	2019	73	29	4	41	58	—	—	37	—	71	RIAA: Platinum; ARIA: Gold; MC: Platinum; RMNZ: Platinum	Free Spirit
"Trigger" (with Major Lazer)	2019	—	—	—	46	—	—	—	— (Note: "Trigger" did not enter the NZ Top 40 Singles Chart, but peaked at number 11 on the NZ Hot Singles Chart.)	57	95	RMNZ: Gold	Death Stranding: Timefall and Music Is the Weapon
"Up All Night"	2019	89	42	13	35	79	—	—	36	— (Note: "Up All Night" did not enter the Swedish Singellista Chart, but peaked at number two on the Swedish Heatseeker Chart.)	55	ARIA: Gold; BPI: Silver; RMNZ: Platinum	Non-album singles
"Eleven" (solo or featuring Summer Walker)	2020	83	39	10	48	52	—	—	— (Note: "Eleven" did not enter the NZ Top 40 Singles Chart, but peaked at number seven on the NZ Hot Singles Chart.)	71	70	ARIA: Gold; RMNZ: Platinum	Non-album singles
"Know Your Worth" (with Disclosure)	2020	57	26	8	31	46	—	28	31	64	27	ARIA: Platinum; BPI: Platinum; IFPI DEN: Gold; MC: Platinum; RMNZ: 2× Platinum	Energy
"Experience" (with Victoria Monét and SG Lewis)	2020	—	—	—	—	—	—	—	—	—	—		Jaguar
"Be Like That" (with Kane Brown and Swae Lee)	2020	19	—	—	53	6	—	—	— (Note: "Be Like That" did not enter the NZ Top 40 Singles Chart, but peaked at number six on the NZ Hot Singles Chart.)	—	—	RIAA: 4× Platinum; ARIA: Gold; BPI: Silver; MC: 6× Platinum; RMNZ: Platinum	Mixtape, Vol. 1
"Otra Noche Sin Ti" (with J Balvin)	2021	— (Note: "Otra Noche Sin Ti" did not enter the Billboard Hot 100 chart, but peaked at number five on the Bubbling Under Hot 100 chart.)	—	—	—	—	—	—	— (Note: "Otra Noche Sin Ti" did not enter the NZ Top 40 Singles Chart, but peaked at number 23 on the NZ Hot Singles Chart.)	—	—		Jose
"Working" (with Tate McRae)	2021	88	—	—	—	47	—	—	— (Note: "Working" did not enter the NZ Top 40 Singles Chart, but peaked at number six on the NZ Hot Singles Chart.)	— (Note: "Working" did not enter the Swedish Singles Chart, but peaked at number six on the Swedish Heatseeker chart.)	—	MC: Gold	Non-album singles
"New Normal"	2021	— (Note: "New Normal" did not enter the Billboard Hot 100 chart, but peaked at number two on the Bubbling Under Hot 100 chart.)	—	—	87	69	—	—	— (Note: "New Normal" did not enter the NZ Top 40 Singles Chart, but peaked at number eight on the NZ Hot Singles Chart.)	62	—		Non-album singles
"Present"	2021	— (Note: "Present" did not enter the Billboard Hot 100 chart, but peaked at number five on the Bubbling Under Hot 100 chart.)	48	10	—	75	—	—	— (Note: "Present" did not enter the NZ Top 40 Singles Chart, but peaked at number four on the NZ Hot Singles Chart.)	— (Note: "Present" did not enter the Swedish Singellista Chart, but peaked at number four on the Swedish Heatseeker Chart.)	—		Scenic Drive
"Fall in Love at Christmas" (with Mariah Carey and Kirk Franklin)	2021	—	—	24	—	—	—	—	—	—	—		Non-album singles
"Last Call"	2022	— (Note: "Last Call" did not enter the Billboard Hot 100 chart, but peaked at number 12 on the Bubbling Under Hot 100 chart.)	—	12	—	79	—	—	— (Note: "Last Call" did not enter the NZ Top 40 Singles Chart, but peaked at number 15 on the NZ Hot Singles Chart.)	— (Note: "Last Call" did not enter the Swedish Singellista Chart, but peaked at number 19 on the Swedish Heatseeker Chart.)	—		Non-album singles
"Skyline"	2022	— (Note: "Skyline" did not enter the Billboard Hot 100 chart, but peaked at number 15 on the Bubbling Under Hot 100 chart.)	—	—	—	90	—	—	— (Note: "Skyline" did not enter the NZ Top 40 Singles Chart, but peaked at number 12 on the NZ Hot Singles Chart.)	—	—	MC: Gold	Non-album singles
"Numb" (with Marshmello)	2022	40	—	—	38	4	—	42	— (Note: "Numb" did not enter the NZ Top 40 Singles Chart, but peaked at number seven on the NZ Hot Singles Chart.)	26	—	RIAA: Platinum; ARIA: Platinum; BPI: Silver; GLF: Gold; IFPI DEN: Gold; MC: 2× Platinum; RMNZ: Platinum	Non-album singles
"Wish You Were Here" (with Lukas Graham)	2022	—	—	—	—	—	10	—	— (Note: "Wish You Were Here" did not enter the NZ Top 40 Singles Chart, but peaked at number seven on the NZ Hot Singles Chart.)	27	—	IFPI DEN: Gold	4 (The Pink Album)
"Satellite"	2022	—	—	—	—	—	—	—	— (Note: "Satellite" did not enter the NZ Top 40 Singles Chart, but peaked at number 10 on the NZ Hot Singles Chart.)	—	—		Non-album singles
"Not Alone" (with Joe Jonas)	2022	—	—	—	—	—	—	—	—	—	—		Non-album singles
"We Go Down Together" (with Dove Cameron)	2023	—	—	—	—	100	—	—	— (Note: "We Go Down Together" did not enter the NZ Top 40 Singles Chart, but peaked at number seven on the NZ Hot Singles Chart.)	—	—		Non-album singles
"The Hard Way" (with Pnau)	2023	—	—	—	—	—	—	— (Note: "The Hard Way" did not enter the Single Top 100, but peaked at number 16 on the Single Tip chart.)	— (Note: "The Hard Way" did not enter the NZ Top 40 Singles Chart, but peaked at number 11 on the NZ Hot Singles Chart.)	—	—		Hyperbolic
"Softest Touch"	2023	—	—	—	—	—	—	—	— (Note: "Softest Touch" did not enter the NZ Top 40 Singles Chart, but peaked at number 25 on the NZ Hot Singles Chart.)	—	—		Non-album singles
"Be the One" (with Bree Runway)	2023	—	—	—	—	—	—	—	— (Note: "Be the One" did not enter the NZ Top 40 Singles Chart, but peaked at number 32 on the NZ Hot Singles Chart.)	—	—		Non-album singles
"Favorite Song" (remix) (with Toosii)	2023	—	—	—	—	—	—	—	— (Note: "Favorite Song" (remix) did not enter the NZ Top 40 Singles Chart, but peaked at number 21 on the NZ Hot Singles Chart.)	—	—		Naujour
"Please Don't Fall in Love with Me"	2024	— (Note: "Please Don't Fall in Love with Me" did not enter the Billboard Hot 100 chart, but peaked at number 12 on the Bubbling Under Hot 100 chart.)	—	6	—	—	—	—	— (Note: "Please Don't Fall in Love with Me" did not enter the NZ Top 40 Singles Chart, but peaked at number 11 on the NZ Hot Singles Chart.)	—	—		Sincere
"Adore U"	2024	—	—	10	—	—	—	—	— (Note: "Adore U" did not enter the NZ Top 40 Singles Chart, but peaked at number 11 on the NZ Hot Singles Chart.)	—	—		Sincere
"Ground"	2024	—	—	17	—	—	—	—	— (Note: "Ground" did not enter the NZ Top 40 Singles Chart, but peaked at number 16 on the NZ Hot Singles Chart.)	—	—		Sincere
"Heatstroke"	2024	— (Note: "Heatstroke" did not enter the Billboard Hot 100 chart, but peaked at number 23 on the Pop Airplay chart.)	—	—	—	—	—	—	— (Note: "Heatstroke" did not enter the NZ Top 40 Singles Chart, but peaked at number 12 on the NZ Hot Singles Chart.)	—	—		Sincere
"All I Know" (with Rudimental)	2025	—	—	—	—	—	—	—	—	—	56		Rudim3ntal
"In Plain Sight"	2025	—	—	—	—	—	—	—	— (Note: "Plain Sight" did not enter the NZ Top 40 Singles Chart, but peaked at number 12 on the NZ Hot Singles Chart.)	—	—		After the Sun Goes Down
"Nobody (Make Me Feel)" (with oskar med k)	2025	—	—	—	—	—	—	— (Note: "Nobody (Make Me Feel)" did not enter the Dutch Single Top 100 chart, but peaked at number three on the Single Tip chart.)	— (Note: "Nobody (Make Me Feel)" did not enter the NZ Top 40 Singles Chart, but peaked at number 19 on the NZ Hot Singles Chart.)	—	—		After the Sun Goes Down
"Out of Body"	2025	—	—	—	—	—	—	—	— (Note: "Out of Body" did not enter the NZ Top 40 Singles Chart, but peaked at number 20 on the NZ Hot Singles Chart.)	—	—		After the Sun Goes Down
"Nah"	2025	—	40	9	—	—	—	—	— (Note: "Nah" did not enter the NZ Top 40 Singles Chart, but peaked at number 10 on the NZ Hot Singles Chart.)	—	—		After the Sun Goes Down
"Save My Love" (with Kygo and Gryffin)	2026	—	—	—	—	—	—	— (Note: "Save My Love" did not enter the Dutch Single Top 100 chart, but peaked at number four on the Single Tip chart.)	— (Note: "Save My Love" did not enter the NZ Top 40 Singles Chart, but peaked at number 17 on the NZ Hot Singles Chart.)	80	—		Non-album singles
"Dive into Me" (with Alok)	2026	—	—	—	—	—	—	— (Note: "Dive Into Me" did not enter the Dutch Single Top 100 chart, but peaked at number 30 on the Single Tip chart.)	— (Note: "Dive Into Me" did not enter the NZ Top 40 Singles Chart, but peaked at number 19 on the NZ Hot Singles Chart.)	—	—		Non-album singles
"Tied Up" (with Lauv)	2026	—	—	—	—	—	—	—	— (Note: "Tied Up" did not enter the NZ Top 40 Singles Chart, but peaked at number 14 on the NZ Hot Singles Chart.)	—	—		Non-album singles
"Something Special" (with Ahn Hyo-seop and Fandom)	2026	—	—	—	—	—	—	—	—	—	—		Non-album singles
"Here with Me Now" (with It's Murph)	2026	—	—	—	—	—	—	—	— (Note: "Here with Me Now" did not enter the NZ Top 40 Singles Chart, but peaked at number 37 on the NZ Hot Singles Chart.)	—	—		Non-album singles
"Weekend" (with Meduza)	2026	—	—	—	—	—	—	—	— (Note: "Weekend" did not enter the NZ Top 40 Singles Chart, but peaked at number 36 on the NZ Hot Singles Chart.)	—	—		Non-album singles
"—" denotes a recording that did not chart or was not released in that territory.

=== As featured artist ===
List of singles as featured artist, showing year released and album name
Title	Year	Peak chart positions										Certifications	Album
Title	Year	US	US R&B/ HH	US Dance	AUS	CAN	DEN	NLD	NZ	SWE	UK	Certifications	Album
"Electric" (Alina Baraz featuring Khalid)	2017	—	—	—	—	—	—	—	—	—	—	BPI: Silver; RMNZ: 2× Platinum	The Color of You
"1-800-273-8255" (Logic featuring Alessia Cara and Khalid)	2017	3	2	—	5	6	2	23	6	4	9	RIAA: 8× Platinum; ARIA: 3× Platinum; BPI: 2× Platinum; IFPI DEN: 2× Platinum; MC: 5× Platinum; RMNZ: 5× Platinum	Everybody
"Rollin" (Calvin Harris featuring Future and Khalid)	2017	62	27	8	40	36	—	58	34	85	43	RIAA: 2× Platinum; ARIA: Platinum; BPI: Silver; GLF: Gold; IFPI DEN: Gold; MC: 3× Platinum; RMNZ: 2× Platinum	Funk Wav Bounces Vol. 1
"Silence" (Marshmello featuring Khalid)	2017	30	—	1	5	7	7	11	3	5	3	RIAA: 6× Platinum; ARIA: 7× Platinum; BPI: 3× Platinum; GLF: 5× Platinum; IFPI DEN: 3× Platinum; MC: 9× Platinum; RMNZ: 7× Platinum	Non-album single
"Why Don't You Come On" (DJDS featuring Khalid and Empress Of)	2017	—	—	30	—	—	—	—	— (Note: "Why Don't You Come On" did not enter the NZ Top 40 Singles Chart, but peaked at number nine on the NZ Heatseeker Singles Chart.)	—	—		Big Wave More Fire
"Homemade Dynamite" (remix) (Lorde featuring Khalid, Post Malone, and SZA)	2017	92	—	—	23	54	—	92	20	84	—	ARIA: 5× Platinum; MC: Platinum; RMNZ: Platinum	Melodrama
"Don't Let Me Down" (Sabrina Claudio featuring Khalid)	2018	—	—	—	—	—	—	—	— (Note: "Don't Let Me Down" did not enter the NZ Top 40 Singles Chart, but peaked at number 10 on the NZ Heatseeker Singles Chart.)	—	—		Non-album single
"Youth" (Shawn Mendes featuring Khalid)	2018	65	—	—	19	22	14	24	22	23	35	RIAA: Gold; ARIA: 2× Platinum; BPI: Silver; IFPI DEN: Gold; MC: Platinum; RMNZ: Platinum	Shawn Mendes
"Ocean" (Martin Garrix featuring Khalid)	2018	78	—	5	12	28	17	16	11	11	25	RIAA: Platinum; ARIA: 3× Platinum; BPI: Platinum; IFPI DEN: Platinum; MC: Platinum; RMNZ: 2× Platinum	Non-album single
"Trippin'" (Buddy featuring Khalid)	2018	—	—	—	—	—	—	—	—	—	—		Harlan & Alondra
"Beautiful People" (Ed Sheeran featuring Khalid)	2019	13	—	—	4	6	3	6	2	3	1	RIAA: Platinum; ARIA: 6× Platinum; BPI: 3× Platinum; IFPI DEN: 2× Platinum; MC: 8× Platinum; RMNZ: 5× Platinum	No. 6 Collaborations Project
"Caught Up" (Majid Jordan featuring Khalid)	2019	—	—	—	—	—	—	—	— (Note: "Caught Up" did not enter the NZ Top 40 Singles Chart, but peaked at number 21 on the NZ Hot Singles Chart.)	—	—		Non-album single
"Hurts 2B Human" (Pink featuring Khalid)	2019	—	—	—	48	87	—	28	—	— (Note: "Hurts 2B Human" did not enter the Sweden Singles Chart, but peaked at number 4 on the Sweden Heatseakers.)	61	ARIA: Platinum; BPI: Silver; RMNZ: Gold	Hurts 2B Human
"Off the Grid" (Alina Baraz featuring Khalid)	2020	—	—	—	—	—	—	—	— (Note: "Off the Grid" did not enter the NZ Top 40 Singles Chart, but peaked at number 24 on the NZ Hot Singles Chart.)	—	—		It Was Divine
"So Done" (Alicia Keys featuring Khalid)	2020	—	—	—	—	—	—	—	— (Note: "So Done" did not enter the NZ Top 40 Singles Chart, but peaked at number 10 on the NZ Hot Singles Chart.)	—	—		Alicia
"—" denotes a recording that did not chart or was not released in that territory.

=== Promotional singles ===
Title	Year	Peak chart positions										Certifications	Album
Title	Year	US	US R&B/ HH	US R&B	AUS	CAN	DEN	NZ	SWE	UK	UK R&B	Certifications	Album
"Let's Go"	2016	—	—	—	—	—	—	—	—	—	—	RIAA: Gold; MC: Platinum; RMNZ: Gold	American Teen
"Hopeless"	2016	—	—	—	—	—	—	—	—	—	—	RIAA: Gold; MC: Gold	American Teen
"Reasons"	2016	—	—	—	—	—	—	—	—	—	—		Non-album single
"Coaster"	2016	—	—	19	—	—	—	—	—	—	—	RIAA: 2× Platinum; ARIA: Platinum; BPI: Silver; IFPI DEN: Gold; MC: 2× Platinum; RMNZ: Platinum	American Teen
"Shot Down"	2017	—	—	—	—	—	—	—	—	—	—	RIAA: Platinum; ARIA: Gold; MC: Platinum; RMNZ: Gold	American Teen
"American Teen"	2017	—	—	22	—	—	—	—	—	—	—	RIAA: Platinum; BPI: Silver; IFPI DEN: Gold; MC: Platinum; RMNZ: Platinum	American Teen
"My Bad"	2019	55	19	3	14	29	28	10	96	32	30	RIAA: Platinum; ARIA: Platinum; MC: Platinum; RMNZ: Platinum	Free Spirit
"Self"	2019	— (Note: "Self" did not enter the Billboard Hot 100 chart, but peaked at number 16 on the Bubbling Under Hot 100 chart.)	— (Note: "Self" did not enter the Hot R&B/Hip-Hop Songs chart, but peaked at number three on the Bubbling Under R&B/Hip-Hop Singles chart.)	14	93	77	—	— (Note: "Self" did not enter the NZ Top 40 Singles Chart, but peaked at number seven on the NZ Hot Singles Chart.)	— (Note: "Self" did not enter the Swedish Singellista Chart, but peaked at number 10 on the Swedish Heatseeker Chart.)	—	—	MC: Gold	Free Spirit
"Don't Pretend" (featuring Safe)	2019	84	32	8	61	44	—	— (Note: "Don't Pretend" did not enter the NZ Top 40 Singles Chart, but peaked at number seven on the NZ Hot Singles Chart.)	— (Note: "Don't Pretend" did not enter the Swedish Singellista Chart, but peaked at number five on the Swedish Heatseeker Chart.)	—	—	RIAA: Gold; MC: Gold	Free Spirit
"—" denotes a recording that did not chart or was not released in that territory.

== Other charted and certified songs ==
Title	Year	Peak chart positions									Certifications	Album
Title	Year	US	US R&B/ HH	US R&B	AUS	CAN	DEN	NZ	SWE	UK	Certifications	Album
"Another Sad Love Song"	2017	—	—	—	—	—	—	—	—	—	RIAA: Platinum; MC: Platinum; RMNZ: Gold	American Teen
"8teen"	2017	—	—	20	—	—	—	—	—	—	RIAA: 3× Platinum; BPI: Platinum; IFPI DEN: Platinum; MC: 4× Platinum; RMNZ: 2× Platinum	American Teen
"Cold Blooded"	2017	—	—	—	—	—	—	—	—	—	RIAA: Gold; MC: Gold	American Teen
"Winter"	2017	—	—	—	—	—	—	—	—	—	RIAA: Gold; MC: Gold	American Teen
"Therapy"	2017	—	—	—	—	—	—	—	—	—	RIAA: Gold; MC: Gold	American Teen
"Keep Me"	2017	—	—	—	—	—	—	—	—	—	RIAA: Gold; MC: Gold	American Teen
"Angels"	2017	—	—	—	—	—	—	—	—	—	RIAA: Gold; MC: Gold; RMNZ: Gold	American Teen
"Thunder / Young Dumb & Broke" (Medley) (with Imagine Dragons)	2018	69	—	—	—	—	—	—	—	—		Non-album song
"The Ways" (with Swae Lee)	2018	63	31	5	—	53	—	— (Note: "The Ways" did not enter the NZ Top 40 Singles Chart or NZ Hot Singles, but peaked at number three on the NZ Heatseeker Singles chart.)	96	54	RMNZ: Gold	Black Panther: The Album
"Floating" (Alina Baraz featuring Khalid)	2018	—	—	—	—	—	—	—	—	—	RMNZ: Gold	The Color of You
"Seasons" (6lack featuring Khalid)	2018	—	—	20	—	—	—	— (Note: "Seasons" did not enter the NZ Top 40 Singles Chart, but peaked at number 15 on the NZ Hot Singles Chart.)	—	—	MC: Gold; RMNZ: Gold	East Atlanta Love Letter
"9.13"	2018	—	—	19	—	—	—	—	—	—		Suncity
"Vertigo"	2018	89	44	7	—	61	—	— (Note: "Vertigo" did not enter the NZ Top 40 Singles Chart, but peaked at number 13 on the NZ Hot Singles Chart.)	— (Note: "Vertigo" did not enter the Swedish Singellista Chart, but peaked at number 12 on the Swedish Heatseeker Chart.)	—	MC: Gold; RMNZ: Gold	Suncity
"Salem's Interlude"	2018	—	—	20	—	—	—	—	—	—		Suncity
"Suncity" (featuring Empress Of)	2018	88	43	6	30	42	40	35	21	41	RIAA: Gold; ARIA: Platinum; BPI: Silver; MC: Platinum	Suncity
"Motion"	2018	— (Note: "Motion" did not enter the Billboard Hot 100 chart, but peaked at number 25 on the Bubbling Under Hot 100 chart.)	—	12	—	72	—	—	—	—	MC: Gold	Suncity
"Intro"	2019	—	—	21	—	—	—	—	—	—		Free Spirit
"Bad Luck"	2019	87	33	9	80	64	—	— (Note: "Bad Luck" did not enter the NZ Top 40 Singles Chart, but peaked at number eight on the NZ Hot Singles Chart.)	—	—	RIAA: Gold; MC: Gold; RMNZ: Gold	Free Spirit
"Hundred"	2019	— (Note: "Hundred" did not enter the Billboard Hot 100 chart, but peaked at number six on the Bubbling Under Hot 100 chart.)	47	12	—	78	—	—	—	—	RIAA: Gold	Free Spirit
"Outta My Head" (with John Mayer)	2019	58	22	5	20	50	29	20	43	45	RIAA: Gold; ARIA: Gold; MC: Platinum; RMNZ: Platinum	Free Spirit
"Free Spirit"	2019	— (Note: "Free Spirit" did not enter the Billboard Hot 100 chart, but peaked at number seven on the Bubbling Under Hot 100 chart.)	48	13	—	82	—	—	—	—	RIAA: Gold; MC: Gold	Free Spirit
"Twenty One"	2019	— (Note: "Twenty One" did not enter the Billboard Hot 100 chart, but peaked at number 18 on the Bubbling Under Hot 100 chart.)	— (Note: "Twenty One" did not enter the Hot R&B/Hip-Hop Songs chart, but peaked at number four on the Bubbling Under R&B/Hip-Hop Singles chart.)	17	—	85	—	—	—	—		Free Spirit
"Bluffin'"	2019	—	— (Note: "Bluffin'" did not enter the Hot R&B/Hip-Hop Songs chart, but peaked at number nine on the Bubbling Under R&B/Hip-Hop Singles chart.)	20	—	—	—	—	—	—		Free Spirit
"Alive"	2019	—	—	22	—	—	—	—	—	—		Free Spirit
"Heaven"	2019	—	—	23	—	—	—	—	—	—		Free Spirit
"As I Am" (Justin Bieber featuring Khalid)	2021	43	—	—	23	9	5	32	29	24	RIAA: Gold; ARIA: Gold; RMNZ: Gold	Justice
"Retrograde" (featuring 6lack and Lucky Daye)	2021	—	—	—	—	—	—	— (Note: "Retrograde" did not enter the NZ Top 40 Singles Chart, but peaked at number 39 on the NZ Hot Singles Chart.)	—	—		Scenic Drive
"Scenic Drive" (featuring Smino and Ari Lennox)	2021	—	—	—	—	—	—	— (Note: "Scenic Drive" did not enter the NZ Top 40 Singles Chart, but peaked at number 13 on the NZ Hot Singles Chart.)	—	—		Scenic Drive
"Wild Dreams" (Burna Boy featuring Khalid)	2022	—	—	—	—	—	—	—	55	—		Love, Damini
"Everything We See"	2024	—	—	—	—	—	—	— (Note: "Everything We See" did not enter the NZ Top 40 Singles Chart, but peaked at number 35 on the NZ Hot Singles Chart.)	—	—		Sincere
"Altitude"	2024	—	—	—	—	—	—	— (Note: "Altitude" did not enter the NZ Top 40 Singles Chart, but peaked at number 33 on the NZ Hot Singles Chart.)	—	—		Sincere
"It's All Good"	2024	—	—	—	—	—	—	— (Note: "It's All Good" did not enter the NZ Top 40 Singles Chart, but peaked at number 37 on the NZ Hot Singles Chart.)	—	—		Sincere
"—" denotes a recording that did not chart or was not released in that territory.

== Guest appearances ==
List of non-single guest appearances, with other performing artists, showing year released and album name
Title	Year	Other artist(s)	Album
"The Ways"	2018	Swae Lee	Black Panther: The Album
"Runaway"	2018	Tayla Parx	Tayla Made
"No Pain"	2018	DJDS (featuring Charlie Wilson & Charlotte Day Wilson)	Big Wave More Fire
"Too Gone"	2018	Rich the Kid	The World Is Yours
"Floating"	2018	Alina Baraz	The Color of You
"iMissMe"	2018	Kyle	Light of Mine
"Stay"	2018	None	Uncle Drew
"Seasons"	2018	6lack	East Atlanta Love Letter
"Days Like This"	2019	GoldLink	Diaspora
"Another Day Gone"	2020	A Boogie wit da Hoodie	Artist 2.0
"As I Am"	2021	Justin Bieber	Justice
"Come for Me"	2021	Alicia Keys, Lucky Daye	Keys
"Ur Baby"	2022	Anitta	Versions of Me
"Wild Dreams"	2022	Burna Boy	Love, Damini
"You & I"	2023	Anne-Marie	Unhealthy
"Ways to Go"	2024	Alec Benjamin	12 Notes

== Music videos ==
List of music videos, showing year released and directors
Title	Year	Director(s)
"Location"	2016	Alex Di Marco
"Shot Down"	2017	—N/a
"American Teen"	2017	Scott Fleishman
"Young Dumb & Broke"	2017	Calmatic
"Saved"	2017	David Hedman
"Love Lies" (with Normani)	2018	Gerard Bush, Christopher Renz
"OTW" (ft. 6LACK, Ty Dolla $ign)	2018	Calmatic
"Better"	2018	Andrew Donoho
"Saturday Nights" (remix with Kane Brown)	2019	Joe Weil
"Talk"	2019	Emil Nava
"Free Spirit"	2019	Emil Nava
"Right Back" (featuring A Boogie wit da Hoodie)	2019	—N/a
