= List of Billboard number-one dance songs of 2025 =

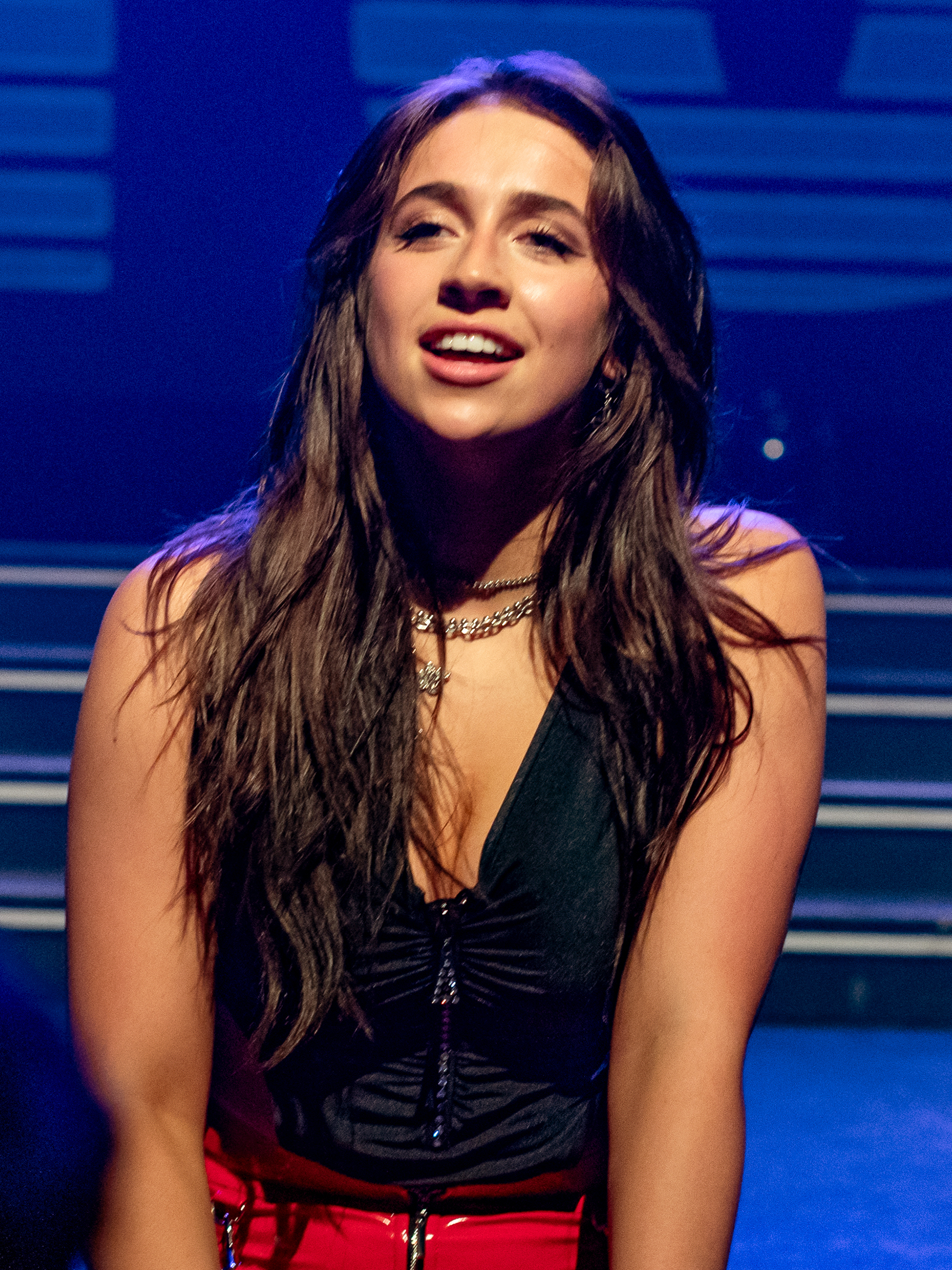
Tate McRae scored three number ones on the Hot Dance/Pop Songs in 2025.

Billboard magazine compiled the top-performing dance songs in the United States during 2025 on three main charts: the Hot Dance/Electronic Songs, the Hot Dance/Pop Songs, and the Dance/Mix Show Airplay. The Dance/Mix Show Airplay was first published in 2003, ranking songs based on airplay detections on dance radio, as well as mix-show plays on top 40 radio and select rhythmic radio as measured by Mediabase. Both the Hot Dance/Electronic Songs and the Hot Dance/Pop Songs are multi-metric charts, ranking songs based on streaming and sales as tracked by Luminate, as well as airplay audience impressions from radio stations of all formats as measured by Mediabase. First published in 2013, the Hot Dance/Electronic Songs was revamped in January 2025 to focus on songs primarily recorded by DJs or producers, with an emphasis on electronic-based production. As a result, the Hot Dance/Pop Songs chart was created to compile songs with "dance-centric vocals, melody, and hooks by artists not rooted in the dance genre".

Tate McRae's "It's OK I'm OK" was the first number one on the Hot/Dance Pop Songs on January 18. She earned another two chart-toppers this year with "Revolving Door" and "Just Keep Watching". The longest-running number one on the chart was "How It's Done" (25 consecutive weeks) by Huntrix vocalists Ejae, Audrey Nuna and Rei Ami. Meanwhile, "Miles on It" by Marshmello and Kane Brown spent 30 consecutive weeks atop the Hot Dance/Electronic Songs during 2025, becoming the year's best-performing song on the chart. Only two other songs topped the chart this year: "No Broke Boys" by Disco Lines and Tinashe and "Dracula" by Tame Impala. "No Broke Boys" was the only song to top both the Hot chart and airplay chart in 2025.

== Chart history ==
Key
†	Indicates top-performing song of 2025.

Chart history
Issue date	Hot Dance/Electronic Songs			Hot Dance/Pop Songs			Dance/Mix Show Airplay		
Issue date	Song	Artist(s)	Ref.	Song	Artist(s)	Ref.	Song	Artist(s)	Ref.
January 4	"Miles on It" †	Marshmello and Kane Brown		Not issued (merge with Hot Dance/Electronic Songs)			"Get Busy"	Anabel Englund	
January 11	"Miles on It" †	Marshmello and Kane Brown		Not issued (merge with Hot Dance/Electronic Songs)			"Never Been Yours"	Benny Benassi and Oaks	
January 18	"Miles on It" †	Marshmello and Kane Brown		"It's OK I'm OK"	Tate McRae		"Forever Young"	David Guetta, Alphaville and Ava Max	
January 25	"Miles on It" †	Marshmello and Kane Brown		"It's OK I'm OK"	Tate McRae		"Forever Young"	David Guetta, Alphaville and Ava Max	
February 1	"Miles on It" †	Marshmello and Kane Brown		"It's OK I'm OK"	Tate McRae		"Forever Young"	David Guetta, Alphaville and Ava Max	
February 8	"Miles on It" †	Marshmello and Kane Brown		"It's OK I'm OK"	Tate McRae		"Told You So"	Martin Garrix and Jex	
February 15	"Miles on It" †	Marshmello and Kane Brown		"Abracadabra" †	Lady Gaga		"Told You So"	Martin Garrix and Jex	
February 22	"Miles on It" †	Marshmello and Kane Brown		"Abracadabra" †	Lady Gaga		"Cave"	Dom Dolla and Tove Lo	
March 1	"Miles on It" †	Marshmello and Kane Brown		"Abracadabra" †	Lady Gaga		"Push the Tempo"	Sub Focus and Katy B	
March 8	"Miles on It" †	Marshmello and Kane Brown		"Revolving Door"	Tate McRae		"Hypnotized"	Anyma and Ellie Goulding	
March 15	"Miles on It" †	Marshmello and Kane Brown		"Revolving Door"	Tate McRae		"Hypnotized"	Anyma and Ellie Goulding	
March 22	"Miles on It" †	Marshmello and Kane Brown		"Abracadabra" †	Lady Gaga		"Someone Else"	GT Ofice	
March 29	"Miles on It" †	Marshmello and Kane Brown		"Abracadabra" †	Lady Gaga		"Crash"	Loud Luxury	
April 5	"Miles on It" †	Marshmello and Kane Brown		"Abracadabra" †	Lady Gaga		"Crash"	Loud Luxury	
April 12	"Miles on It" †	Marshmello and Kane Brown		"Abracadabra" †	Lady Gaga		"Into the Blue"	Will Sass & Kamille	
April 19	"Miles on It" †	Marshmello and Kane Brown		"Abracadabra" †	Lady Gaga		"Into the Blue"	Will Sass & Kamille	
April 26	"Miles on It" †	Marshmello and Kane Brown		"Abracadabra" †	Lady Gaga		"Into the Blue"	Will Sass & Kamille	
May 3	"Miles on It" †	Marshmello and Kane Brown		"Abracadabra" †	Lady Gaga		"Beautiful People"	David Guetta & Sia	
May 10	"Miles on It" †	Marshmello and Kane Brown		"Abracadabra" †	Lady Gaga		"Beautiful People"	David Guetta & Sia	
May 17	"Miles on It" †	Marshmello and Kane Brown		"Abracadabra" †	Lady Gaga		"Beautiful People"	David Guetta & Sia	
May 24	"Miles on It" †	Marshmello and Kane Brown		"Abracadabra" †	Lady Gaga		"The Less I Know the Better"	Mau P	
May 31	"Miles on It" †	Marshmello and Kane Brown		"Abracadabra" †	Lady Gaga		"Say My Name" (remix)	Morgan Seatree featuring Florence + the Machine	
June 7	"Miles on It" †	Marshmello and Kane Brown		"Abracadabra" †	Lady Gaga		"Dreamin"	Dom Dolla featuring Daya	
June 14	"Miles on It" †	Marshmello and Kane Brown		"Just Keep Watching"	Tate McRae		"Wrap Yourself Around Me"	D.O.D. featuring North	
June 21	"Miles on It" †	Marshmello and Kane Brown		"Abracadabra" †	Lady Gaga		"Don't Wake Me Up"	James Hype	
June 28	"Miles on It" †	Marshmello and Kane Brown		"Abracadabra" †	Lady Gaga		"Come with Me"	Major League DJz and Jorja Smith	
July 5	"Miles on It" †	Marshmello and Kane Brown		"Abracadabra" †	Lady Gaga		"Never Forget You"	Afrojack	
July 12	"Miles on It" †	Marshmello and Kane Brown		"How It's Done"	Huntrix: Ejae, Audrey Nuna and Rei Ami		"Surrender"	Alesso and Becky Hill	
July 19	"Miles on It" †	Marshmello and Kane Brown		"How It's Done"	Huntrix: Ejae, Audrey Nuna and Rei Ami		"Blessings"	Calvin Harris and Clementine Douglas	
July 26	"Miles on It" †	Marshmello and Kane Brown		"How It's Done"	Huntrix: Ejae, Audrey Nuna and Rei Ami		"Blessings"	Calvin Harris and Clementine Douglas	
August 2	"No Broke Boys"	Disco Lines and Tinashe		"How It's Done"	Huntrix: Ejae, Audrey Nuna and Rei Ami		"In My Arms"	Illenium and Hayla	
August 9	"No Broke Boys"	Disco Lines and Tinashe		"How It's Done"	Huntrix: Ejae, Audrey Nuna and Rei Ami		"Won't Be Possible" †	Tiësto, Odd Mob and Goodboys	
August 16	"No Broke Boys"	Disco Lines and Tinashe		"How It's Done"	Huntrix: Ejae, Audrey Nuna and Rei Ami		"A Better World"	David Guetta and Cedric Gervais	
August 23	"No Broke Boys"	Disco Lines and Tinashe		"How It's Done"	Huntrix: Ejae, Audrey Nuna and Rei Ami		"Mad"	Martin Garrix and Lauv	
August 30	"No Broke Boys"	Disco Lines and Tinashe		"How It's Done"	Huntrix: Ejae, Audrey Nuna and Rei Ami		"No Broke Boys"	Disco Lines and Tinashe	
September 6	"No Broke Boys"	Disco Lines and Tinashe		"How It's Done"	Huntrix: Ejae, Audrey Nuna and Rei Ami		"No Broke Boys"	Disco Lines and Tinashe	
September 13	"No Broke Boys"	Disco Lines and Tinashe		"How It's Done"	Huntrix: Ejae, Audrey Nuna and Rei Ami		"No Broke Boys"	Disco Lines and Tinashe	
September 20	"No Broke Boys"	Disco Lines and Tinashe		"How It's Done"	Huntrix: Ejae, Audrey Nuna and Rei Ami		"R U Down?"	Loud Luxury	
September 27	"No Broke Boys"	Disco Lines and Tinashe		"How It's Done"	Huntrix: Ejae, Audrey Nuna and Rei Ami		"Wait So Long"	Swedish House Mafia	
October 4	"No Broke Boys"	Disco Lines and Tinashe		"How It's Done"	Huntrix: Ejae, Audrey Nuna and Rei Ami		"Loosen Up"	Hugel and Dawty featuring Preston Harris	
October 11	"No Broke Boys"	Disco Lines and Tinashe		"How It's Done"	Huntrix: Ejae, Audrey Nuna and Rei Ami		"Loosen Up"	Hugel and Dawty featuring Preston Harris	
October 18	"No Broke Boys"	Disco Lines and Tinashe		"How It's Done"	Huntrix: Ejae, Audrey Nuna and Rei Ami		"Waterfalls"	James Hype featuring Sam Harper and Bobby Harvey	
October 25	"No Broke Boys"	Disco Lines and Tinashe		"How It's Done"	Huntrix: Ejae, Audrey Nuna and Rei Ami		"Move a Little Closer"	DVBBS and Abi Flynn	
November 1	"Dracula"	Tame Impala		"How It's Done"	Huntrix: Ejae, Audrey Nuna and Rei Ami		"Crush"	Zara Larsson	
November 8	"Dracula"	Tame Impala		"How It's Done"	Huntrix: Ejae, Audrey Nuna and Rei Ami		"Tesla"	Mau P	
November 15	"Dracula"	Tame Impala		"How It's Done"	Huntrix: Ejae, Audrey Nuna and Rei Ami		"Super Powers"	TELYKAST and Oaks	
November 22	"No Broke Boys"	Disco Lines and Tinashe		"How It's Done"	Huntrix: Ejae, Audrey Nuna and Rei Ami		"Ocean"	Calvin Harris and Jessie Reyez	
November 29	"No Broke Boys"	Disco Lines and Tinashe		"How It's Done"	Huntrix: Ejae, Audrey Nuna and Rei Ami		"Forever"	ILLENIUM, Tom Grennan and Alna	
December 6	"No Broke Boys"	Disco Lines and Tinashe		"How It's Done"	Huntrix: Ejae, Audrey Nuna and Rei Ami		"Make Me Feel"	oskar med k	
December 13	"No Broke Boys"	Disco Lines and Tinashe		"How It's Done"	Huntrix: Ejae, Audrey Nuna and Rei Ami		"Gone Gone Gone"	David Guetta, Teddy Swims, and Tones and I	
December 20	"Dracula"	Tame Impala		"How It's Done"	Huntrix: Ejae, Audrey Nuna and Rei Ami		"Yes Baby"	Madison Beer	
December 27	"Dracula"	Tame Impala		"How It's Done"	Huntrix: Ejae, Audrey Nuna and Rei Ami		"Yes Baby"	Madison Beer	

== See also ==
- 2025 in American music
- List of Billboard Hot 100 number ones of 2025
