= Working (song) =

2021 single by Tate McRae and Khalid

Single by Tate McRae and Khalid
- Released: June 17, 2021
- Genre: Pop
- Length: 3:30
- Label: RCA
- Songwriters: Joel Little; Khalid Robinson; Sarah Aarons; Tate McRae
- Producer: Little

Tate McRae singles chronology
"U Love U" (2021)	"Working" (2021)	"That Way" (2021)

Khalid singles chronology
"Otra Noche Sin Ti" (2021)	"Working" (2021)	"New Normal" (2021)

Music video
- "Working" on YouTube

"Working" is a song by Canadian singer Tate McRae and American singer Khalid, released on June 17, 2021, by RCA Records. The song was written alongside Sarah Aarons and producer Joel Little. "Working" peaked within the top 50 in Canada, and also appeared on singles charts in the United States, Ireland, and Sweden.

== Background and release ==
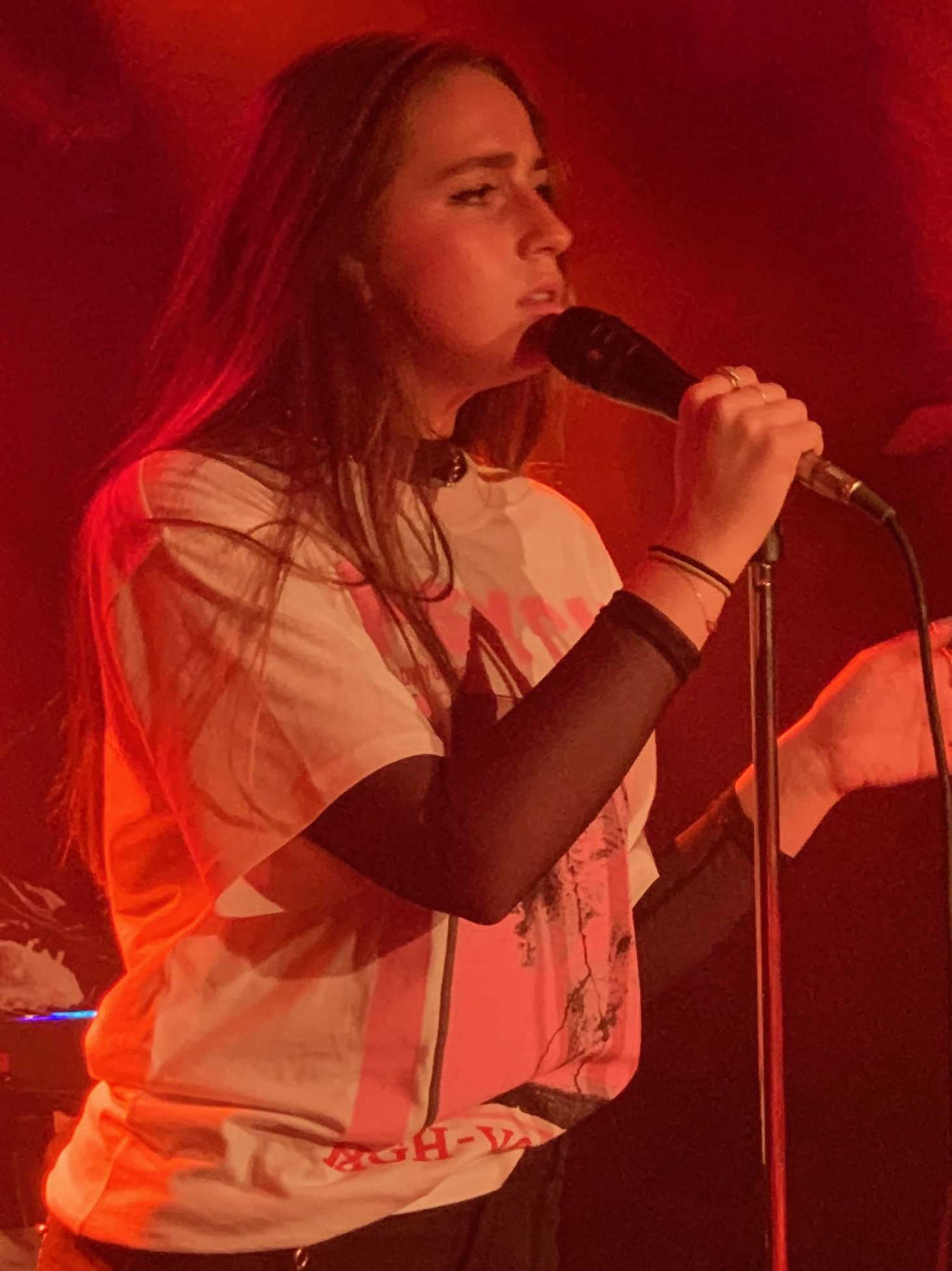
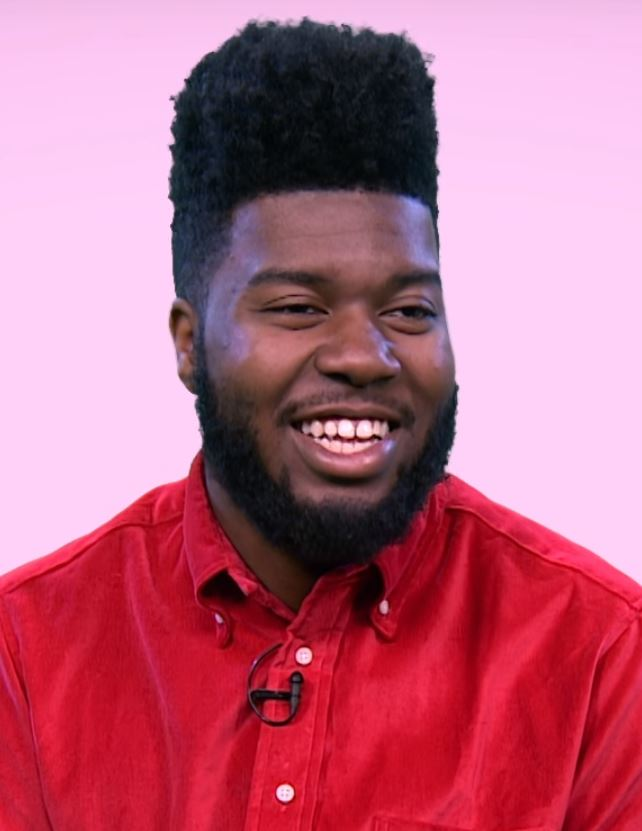
Tate McRae (left) and Khalid (right) both collaborated on "Working".

On June 14, 2021, Tate McRae posted a pre-save link for "Working" to her Twitter account, promising to reveal the release date for the song after 10,000 people pre-saved the single. The following day, both McRae and Khalid announced the release date of "Working" for June 17, 2021. In a press release, McRae wrote that "I usually release a lot of songs that are pretty emotional but this one is just a straight summer bop".

== Critical reception ==
Writing for ET Canada, Shakiel Mahjouri noted a shift on "Working" from McRae's previous "typically emotional tracks", saying that the single "brought upbeat summer heat". Jakori Beauchamp of Rated R&B remarked that "the song covers the confusing dynamic of longing for one another when apart but eager to call it quits when you're reunited in person".

== Music video ==
Before the release of "Working", McRae teased towards a music video for the song, promising it would be available "very soon". On June 22, 2021, McRae announced via Twitter that the video would be released the following day at 10AM Eastern Time. The video begins with McRae at a high-school graduation party, and follows her during a summer vacation, where she works as a babysitter, while a failing relationship weighs on her mind.

== Credits ==
Credits adapted from Tidal and YouTube.

=== Song ===
- Tate McRae – vocals, songwriter
- Khalid – vocals, songwriter
- Joel Little – producer, songwriter
- Sarah Aarons – songwriter
- Dale Becker – mastering engineer
- Denis Kosiak – mixing engineer
- James Keeley – engineer
- Connor Hedge – assistant engineer
- Fili Filizzola – assistant engineer
- Hector Vega – assistant engineer

=== Music video ===
- Matt Dillon Cohen – director
- Daniel Yaro – executive producer
- Naby Dakhli – producer
- Constantin Preda – first assistant director
- Marz Miller – director of photography
- Dylan Knight – editor
- Josh Bohoskey – colorist
- James Troost – steadicam
- Tony Jou – chief lighting technician
- Mike Koepke – chief lighting technician
- Adam Viera – key grip
- Gene Balitski – video tape recorder
- Greg Yaro – production designer
- Michelle Dawley – choreographer
- Sabrina Rivera – video commissioner

== Charts ==
Chart performance for "Working"
Chart (2021)	Peak position
Canada Hot 100 (Billboard)	47
Canada CHR/Top 40 (Billboard)	23
Global 200 (Billboard)	163
Ireland (IRMA)	74
New Zealand Hot Singles (RMNZ)	6
Sweden Heatseeker (Sverigetopplistan)	6
US Billboard Hot 100	88
US Adult Pop Airplay (Billboard)	36
US Pop Airplay (Billboard)	20

== Certifications ==
Certifications for "Working"
Region	Certification	Certified units/sales
Canada (Music Canada)	Gold	40,000^{‡}
^{‡} Sales+streaming figures based on certification alone.

== Release history ==
Release dates and formats for "Working"
Region	Date	Format(s)	Label	Ref.
Various	17 June 2021	Digital download; streaming	RCA	
United States	22 June 2021	Contemporary hit radio	RCA	
Italy	2 July 2021	Contemporary hit radio	Sony	
