= Make Me Feel (oskar med k song) =

2025 single by oskar med k

Single by oskar med k
- Released: 20 June 2025
- Length: 3:06
- Label: 7cult
- Songwriter: Oskar Sjåvåg
- Producer: oskar med k

oskar med k singles chronology
"Can't Find You" (2025)	"Make Me Feel" (2025)	"Nobody (Make Me Feel)" (2025)

Music video
- "Make Me Feel" on YouTube

"Make Me Feel" is a song by Norwegian producer oskar med k, released on 20 June 2025 by 7cult.

== Background ==
"Make Me Feel" grew out of oskar med k's developing sound, which centres on silence, space, and synth-led expression. In an interview for Danish media Unlimited, he described the writing of the song as a fairly long process, with several versions. Written in spring 2025, the track was crafted by means of sampling soul vocals that were then sped up and pitched down.

The song went viral throughout the summer of 2025 across TikTok and other platforms, gaining momentum internationally, and reaching the top of Shazam's Global House chart. The track was subsequently added to regular rotation on some UK and German airplay stations. In the United States, it topped the Billboard Dance/Mix Show Airplay dated 6 December 2025.

== Composition and lyrics ==
The song is built around a vocal sample, with its lyric cutting off after the phrase "make me feel like...", letting place to synth melodies in where the missing word would normally land. Oskar med k interpretates this sudden gap as a way for the melody to express what the vocal leaves unsaid. Billboard found that this creative choice allowed the song to gain international attention. Alongside, the production in itself has been described as "sadness that makes you sweat on the dancefloor", featuring house rhythms, soulful vocals, lush synths and melancholic soundscapes.

== Accolades ==
Awards and nominations for "Make Me Feel"
Year	Ceremony	Award	Result	Ref.
2025	P3 Gull	Song of the Year (Årets låt)	Nominated	

== Charts ==
=== Weekly charts ===
Weekly chart performance for "Make Me Feel"
Chart (2025−2026)	Peak position
Australia (ARIA)	78
Australia Dance (ARIA)	4
Greece International (IFPI)	82
Ireland (IRMA)	35
Lithuania (AGATA)	70
Netherlands (Single Top 100)	56
New Zealand Hot Singles (RMNZ)	29
Portugal (AFP)	124
Switzerland (Schweizer Hitparade)	15
UK Singles (Official Charts)	29
UK Dance (Official Charts)	4
UK Independent (Official Charts)	12
Uruguay Anglo Airplay (Monitor Latino)	12
US Hot Dance/Electronic Songs (Billboard)	7
Venezuela Anglo Airplay (Monitor Latino)	11

=== Year-end charts ===
Year-end chart performance for "Make Me Feel"
Chart (2025)	Position
US Hot Dance/Electronic Songs (Billboard)	22

== Certifications ==
Certifications and sales for "Make Me Feel"
Region	Certification	Certified units/sales
Belgium (BRMA)	Gold	20,000^{‡}
New Zealand (RMNZ)	Platinum	30,000^{‡}
United Kingdom (BPI)	Silver	200,000^{‡}
^{‡} Sales+streaming figures based on certification alone.

== Nobody (Make Me Feel) ==
"Nobody (Make Me Feel)"

Single by oskar med k and Khalid
- Released: 19 September 2025
- Length: 2:45
- Label: 7cult; B1; Sony
- Songwriters: Griff Clawson; Khalid Robinson; Michael Pollack; Oskar Sjåvåg
- Producers: Griff Clawson; Michael Pollack; oskar med k

oskar med k singles chronology
"Make Me Feel" (2025)	"Nobody (Make Me Feel)" (2025)	"Spellbound" (2025)

Khalid singles chronology
"In Plain Sight" (2025)	"Nobody (Make Me Feel)" (2025)	"Out of Body" (2025)

Music video
- "Nobody (Make Me Feel)" on YouTube

A version titled "Nobody (Make Me Feel)" with American singer Khalid was released on 19 September 2025 by 7cult, B1 Recordings, and Sony Music, and features on the singer's fourth album studio After the Sun Goes Down (2025).

=== Background ===
Following the success of "Make Me Feel", Sony Music partnered with oskar med k, inviting Khalid on a new version of the record. The singer found himself inspired with the track's melody, allowing him to write his own lyrics. Oskar med k, who dreamed for long time to work with Khalid, confessed that his favourite moment was when the singer first comes in on the verse, also praising his super smooth flow which takes the song to another level. The record has been described as "both a late-night drive and a club anthem".

=== Personnel ===
- Griff Clawson – composition, lyrics, production, vocal production, engineering, vocal engineering, drum programming, piano, synthetizer
- Michael Pollack – composition, lyrics, production, vocal production, engineering
- oskar med k – composition, lyrics, production
- Khalid – composition, lyrics
- Randy Merrill – mastering engineering
- Bryce Bordone – mixing engineering
- Serban Ghenea – mixing engineering

=== Charts ===
==== Weekly charts ====
Weekly chart performance for "Nobody (Make Me Feel)"
Chart (2025–2026)	Peak position
Austria (Ö3 Austria Top 40)	51
Germany (GfK)	56
Germany Dance (GfK)	4
Netherlands (Single Tip)	3
New Zealand Hot Singles (RMNZ)	20
Norway (IFPI Norge)	77
Portugal (AFP)	82
Switzerland (Schweizer Hitparade)	58
US Hot Dance/Electronic Songs (Billboard)	11

==== Year-end charts ====
Year-end chart performance for "Nobody (Make Me Feel)"
Chart (2025)	Position
Switzerland (Schweizer Hitparade)	82

=== Certifications ===
Certifications and sales for "Nobody (Make Me Feel)"
Region	Certification	Certified units/sales
Portugal (AFP)	Gold	12,000^{‡}
^{‡} Sales+streaming figures based on certification alone.

== See also ==
- List of Billboard number-one dance songs of 2025
