= Numb (Marshmello and Khalid song) =

Single by Marshmello and Khalid
- Released: June 10, 2022
- Genre: Deep house
- Length: 2:35
- Label: Republic; Joytime Collective
- Songwriters: Christopher Comstock; Khalid Robinson; Nicholas Gale; Richard Boardman; Pablo Bowman; Gregory Hein
- Producers: Marshmello; Digital Farm Animals

Marshmello singles chronology
| "Estilazo" (2022) | "Numb" (2022) | "Sah Sah" (2022) |

Khalid singles chronology
| "Skyline" (2022) | "Numb" (2022) | "Wish You Were Here" (2022) |

Music video
- "Numb" on YouTube

"Numb" is a song by American record producer Marshmello and American singer-songwriter Khalid. It was released as a single through Republic and Joytime Collective as a single on June 10th, 2022. The song was produced by Marshmello and Digital Farm Animals, who both wrote it alongside Khalid, Richard Boardman and Pablo Bowman of the songwriting collective the Six, and Aldae. It marks the second collaboration between the two artists, following Marshmello's 2017 single "Silence".

== Background ==
Marshmello and Khalid both spoke about "Numb" in a statement. Marshmello said: "Me and Khalid always talked about doing another song, so I sent this idea to him and he loved it. I was super happy when I asked him if he wanted to do the song and he said yes because the song is a little different vibe for him, but I knew he would crush it. He sent it to me the next day and I immediately knew we had one with this". Khalid said: "Mello and I have a great friendship, and when we get together to make music, it's always great vibes. 'Silence' is a fan favorite that I love performing, so continuing our collaborations with 'Numb' is something that I'm looking forward to".

== Composition and lyrics ==
"Numb" is a deep house song that includes a four on the floor rhythmic pattern rather than a contemporary pop-trap style, which was shown on Marshmello and Khalid's previous collaboration on "Silence". It also contains "uplifting pop dance riffs, a pumping house groove, and sultry vocals from Khalid". The song leans into Marshmello's usual melodic sound that also contains "intoxicating backbeats", which let Khalid's vocals take center stage.

== Release and promotion ==
On May 12, 2022, Marshmello tweeted that he and Khalid needed to work together on another song. He teased the song exactly two weeks later. After both artists posted a few snippets of the song, they announced the song on June 3, 2022.

== Music video ==
The official music video for "Numb" premiered alongside the release of the song on Marshmello's YouTube channel on June 10th, 2022. Uploaded in June 9th, 2022, It starts with Khalid singing while sitting next to a record player before the scene transitions to a house party that includes a pool, in which a lot of women later show up. Joe Price of Complex felt that the video was perfect for the vibe of the song and was reminded of the video for "Silence", in which he concluded that the video for "Numb" shows their collaborative history.

== Credits and personnel ==
- Marshmello – production, songwriting
- Khalid – vocals, songwriting
- Digital Farm Animals – production, songwriting
- Richard Boardman – songwriting
- Pablo Bowman – songwriting
- Aldae – songwriting
- Manny Marroquin – mixing
- Emerson Mancini – mastering
- Denis Kosiak – engineering, vocal production
- James Keeley - engineering, vocal production
- Anthony Vilchis – engineering assistance
- Zach Pereyra – engineering assistance

== Charts ==
=== Weekly charts ===
Weekly chart performance for "Numb"
| Chart (2022–2024) | Peak position |
|---|---|
| Australia (ARIA) | 38 |
| Belgium (Ultratop 50 Flanders) | 18 |
| Canada Hot 100 (Billboard) | 4 |
| Canada AC (Billboard) | 29 |
| Canada CHR/Top 40 (Billboard) | 1 |
| Canada Hot AC (Billboard) | 16 |
| Czech Republic Airplay (ČNS IFPI) | 1 |
| Czech Republic Singles Digital (ČNS IFPI) | 95 |
| Germany (GfK) | 65 |
| Global 200 (Billboard) | 66 |
| Hungary (Rádiós Top 40) | 4 |
| Hungary (Single Top 40) | 34 |
| Ireland (IRMA) | 71 |
| Lithuania (AGATA) | 19 |
| Netherlands (Dutch Top 40) | 27 |
| Netherlands (Single Top 100) | 42 |
| New Zealand Hot Singles (RMNZ) | 7 |
| Norway (VG-lista) | 35 |
| Portugal (AFP) | 130 |
| Romania Airplay (Media Forest) | 5 |
| Romania TV Airplay (Media Forest) | 9 |
| San Marino (SMRRTV Top 50) | 44 |
| South Africa Streaming (TOSAC) | 56 |
| Suriname (Nationale Top 40) | 30 |
| Sweden (Sverigetopplistan) | 26 |
| US Billboard Hot 100 | 40 |
| US Adult Pop Airplay (Billboard) | 19 |
| US Hot Dance/Electronic Songs (Billboard) | 3 |
| US Pop Airplay (Billboard) | 10 |

=== Year-end charts ===
2022 year-end chart performance for "Numb"
| Chart (2022) | Position |
|---|---|
| Belgium (Ultratop 50 Flanders) | 83 |
| Canada (Canadian Hot 100) | 25 |
| Global 200 (Billboard) | 185 |
| US Digital Song Sales (Billboard) | 68 |
| US Hot Dance/Electronic Songs (Billboard) | 5 |
| US Mainstream Top 40 (Billboard) | 42 |

2023 year-end chart performance for "Numb"
| Chart (2023) | Position |
|---|---|
| Estonia Airplay (TopHit) | 79 |
| Hungary (Rádiós Top 40) | 47 |
| US Hot Dance/Electronic Songs (Billboard) | 22 |

2024 year-end chart performance for "Numb"
| Chart (2024) | Position |
|---|---|
| Estonia Airplay (TopHit) | 188 |

== Certifications ==
Certifications for "Numb"
| Region | Certification | Certified units/sales |
|---|---|---|
| Australia (ARIA) | Platinum | 70,000^{‡} |
| Austria (IFPI Austria) | Gold | 15,000^{‡} |
| Brazil (Pro-Música Brasil) | 3× Platinum | 120,000^{‡} |
| Canada (Music Canada) | 2× Platinum | 160,000^{‡} |
| Denmark (IFPI Danmark) | Gold | 45,000^{‡} |
| Hungary (MAHASZ) | 2× Platinum | 8,000^{‡} |
| Italy (FIMI) | Gold | 50,000^{‡} |
| New Zealand (RMNZ) | Platinum | 30,000^{‡} |
| Spain (Promusicae) | Gold | 30,000^{‡} |
| United Kingdom (BPI) | Silver | 200,000^{‡} |
| United States (RIAA) | Platinum | 1,000,000^{‡} |
Streaming
| Sweden (GLF) | Gold | 4,000,000^{†} |
^{‡} Sales+streaming figures based on certification alone.^{†} Streaming-only figures based on certification alone.

== Release history ==
Release history for "Numb"
| Region | Date | Format | Label | Ref. |
|---|---|---|---|---|
| United States | June 10, 2022 | Digital download; streaming | Republic; Joytime Collective | |
| United States | June 21, 2022 | Contemporary hit radio | Republic; Joytime Collective | |
