= Sincere (Khalid album) =

Studio album by Khalid
- Released: August 2, 2024
- Genres: R&B; pop
- Length: 52:03
- Label: RCA
- Producers: Edgar Barrera; Blanda; Chrome Sparks; Matt Dugan; Digi; John Hill; Jason Kellner; Kevin Kofo; Denis Kosiak; Justin Lucas; Nate Mingo; M-Phazes; Psymun; Adrian Rodriguez; Simon Says; Blake Straus; Jef Villaluna

Khalid chronology
Scenic Drive (2021)	Sincere (2024)	After the Sun Goes Down (2025)

Deluxe edition cover

Singles from Sincere
- 1. "Please Don't Fall in Love with Me" Released: April 5, 2024; 2. "Adore U" Released: June 14, 2024; 3. "Ground" Released: July 19, 2024; 4. "Heatstroke" Released: August 23, 2024

Sincere is the third studio album by American singer-songwriter Khalid. It was released through RCA Records on August 2, 2024. His first studio album release since Free Spirit (2019), the album features a sole guest appearance from English singer-songwriter Arlo Parks, who is featured on the eighth track, "Breathe".

The album's deluxe edition was released on December 6, 2024, and included six new songs, with guest appearances from Normani, Ayra Starr and Chloe Bailey.

== Background and composition ==
Five years after his second studio album Free Spirit and the mixtape Scenic Drive (2021), Khalid explained that he needed time to understand what kind of artist he wanted to be after his debut at the age of seventeen. In fact, "I wasn't even writing based on my experiences. I took it back to the roots and approached it as if I were debuting as an artist again. It's like going back to the beginning of my journey, but this time with more awareness and knowledge."

The album featured several authors and producers, including Khalid himself, Aldae, Edgar Barrera, Mark London, Psymun and John Hill; the track "Please Don't Fall in Love With Me" samples "Un-Thinkable (I'm Ready)" by Alicia Keys and Drake.

== Release and promotion ==
On April 5, 2024, Khalid released the lead single of the album, "Please Don't Fall in Love with Me". On June 14, 2024, he released the second single, "Adore U". On July 1, 2024, Khalid announced the album along with its cover art and release date. He released the third single from the album, "Ground", on July 19, 2024. He revealed the tracklist three days later. "Heatstroke" impacted US contemporary hit radio on August 23, 2024, as the album's fourth and final single.

== Critical reception ==
Professional ratings
Review scores
Source	Rating
AllMusic	3/5 stars
The Daily Telegraph	3/5 stars

Mark Kennedy of Associated Press wrote that the album "is a collection of beautiful harmonies and airy and spare rhythms", losing the singer's songwriting past works, pointing out that it "just zips along without leaving much of a trace, [...] maybe because the artist is just treading water". Okla Jones of Essence wrote that Khalid "took a minimalist approach with this project", in which "he visits the more tumultuous side of intimacy, which provides listeners with a smooth balance of storytelling throughout the album".

Andy Kellman of AllMusic penned in a less sanguine review, "doesn't seem to be titled to distinguish the material from what preceded it, though the lyrics are certainly more frank, especially with regard to relationships. The development can be easy to miss; Khalid remains so committed to his groggy and earnest vocal technique that he sticks with it even when he divulges that he wants to incinerate an ex's belongings". Sophie Carlin acknowledged there being "standout, beautiful moments," though in similar sentiments to Kellman, felt several tracks leaned into "blandness," where there was "little to differentiate them, blur into a kind of impressionistic wash".

== Track listing ==
Standard edition track listing
No.	Title	Writer(s)	Producer(s)	Length
1.	"Adore U"	Khalid Robinson; Jamil Chammas; Justin Lucas	Digi; Lucas	2:44
2.	"Everything We See"	Robinson; Jeremy Malvin	Chrome Sparks; Nate Mingo	3:24
3.	"Altitude"	Robinson; Jason Kellner; Denis Kosiak; Jef Villaluna	Kellner; Kosiak; Villaluna	2:38
4.	"It's All Good"	Robinson; Gregory Hein; Malvin	Chrome Sparks	3:28
5.	"Broken"	Robinson; Kellner	Kellner	3:44
6.	"Dose"	Robinson; Malvin; Ojerime Smith	Chrome Sparks; Mingo; Guðrún Veturliðadóttir^{[a]}; Þórhildur Gísladóttir^{[a]}	3:59
7.	"Please Don't Fall in Love with Me"	Robinson; Kerry Brothers Jr.; Aubrey Graham; Kellner; Kosiak; Alicia Keys; Noah Shebib; Villaluna	Kosiak; Kellner	2:57
8.	"Breathe" (featuring Arlo Parks)	Robinson; John Blanda; Kellner; Kosiak; Anaïs Marinho	Blanda; Kellner; Kosiak; Mingo	2:50
9.	"Ground"	Robinson; Aidan Rodriguez; Mark Landon	Rodriguez; M-Phazes; Matt Dugan	3:02
10.	"Who's There to Pick Me Up"	Robinson; Kevin Ekofo; Kellner; Kosiak	Kosiak; Kellner; Kevin Kofo; Mingo	3:29
11.	"Tainted"	Robinson; Kayla Jackson; Kellner; Kosiak; Villaluna	Kosiak; Kellner; Mingo	3:03
12.	"Long Way Home"	Robinson; Chammas; Simon Rosen	Digi; Simon Says	2:17
13.	"Heatstroke"	Robinson; Simon Christensen; John Hill	Hill; Psymun	3:54
14.	"Sincere"	Robinson; Edgar Barrera; Kellner; Kosiak	Barrera; Mingo; Kosiak^{[a]}; Kellner^{[a]}	3:28
15.	"Owe to You"	Robinson; Kellner; Kosiak; Villaluna	Kosiak; Kellner; Mingo	3:41
16.	"Decline"	Robinson; Jake Greene; Kellner; Kosiak; Blake Straus	Kosiak; Kellner; Mingo; Straus	3:25
Total length:				52:03

Deluxe edition track listing
No.	Title	Writer(s)	Producer(s)	Length
17.	"Personal" (featuring Normani)	Robinson; Felisha King Harvey; Chammas; Normani Hamilton; Rosen	Digi; Simon Says	2:36
18.	"Make It Up To You" (featuring Ayra Starr)	Robinson; Kellner; Kosiak; Villaluna; Onyenucheya Uzoma Samuel; Oyinkansola Sarah Aderibigbe	Kosiak; Kellner; Villaluna	2:31
19.	"Passionate"	Robinson; Blanda; Kellner; Kosiak	Blanda; Kellner; Kosiak	3:17
20.	"MIA" (featuring Chlöe)	Robinson; Chloe Bailey; Chammas; Kaelyn Behr	Digi; Styalz Fuego	2:40
21.	"Skin"	Robinson; Michael Pollack; Malvin; Gregory Aldae Hein	Chrome Sparks	3:04
22.	"Faded"	Robinson; Blanda; Kosiak	Blanda; Kosiak	3:50
Total length:				69:58

Note

- ^{^[a]} signifies an additional producer

== Personnel ==
Musicians

- Khalid – lead vocals
- Gunnlaugur Torfi Stefánsson – bass (track 6)
- Jacek Karwan – bass (track 6)
- Þórir Jóhannsson – bass (track 6)
- Bryndís Björgvinsdóttir – cello (track 6)
- Helga B. Ágústsdóttir – cello (track 6)
- Hrafnhilduur Marta Guðmundsdóttir – cello (track 6)
- Victoria Tarveskaia – cello (track 6)
- SinfoniaNord – concert master (track 6)
- Atli Örvarsson – conductor (track 6)
- Eydís Úlfarsdóttir – viola (track 6)
- Eyjolfur Bjarni Alfreðsson – viola (track 6)
- Guðrún Hrund Harðardóttir – viola (track 6)
- Svava Bernharðsdóttir – viola (track 6)
- Chrissie Telma Guðmundsdóttir – violin (track 6)
- Greta Salóme Stefánsdóttir – violin (track 6)
- Gunnhildur Daðadóttir – violin (track 6)
- Guðbjartur Hákonarson – violin (track 6)
- Hlín Erlendsdóttir – violin (track 6)
- Kristján Matthíasson – violin (track 6)
- Marcin Lazarz – violin (track 6)
- Olga Ólafsdóttir – violin (track 6)
- Sigríður Bjarney Baldvinsdóttir – violin (track 6)
- Tomasz Kolosowski – violin (track 6)
- Vera Panitch – violin (track 6)
- Zbigniew Dubik – violin (track 6)
- Zsuzsanna Bitay – violin (track 6)
- Laura Liu – violin (track 6)
- Jef Villaluna – guitar (track 7)

Technical

- Dale Becker – mastering
- Denis Kosiak – mixing, vocal production (all tracks); engineering (tracks 1–3, 6–16)
- Leandro "Dro" Hidalgo – mixing (track 11)
- Cooper Leith – engineering (tracks 1, 4, 5, 7, 8, 11–13, 15, 16)
- Haukur Pálmason – engineering (track 6)
- Árni F. Sigurðsson – engineering (track 6)
- Katie Harvey – engineering assistance
- Noah McCorkle – engineering assistance (tracks 1–3, 6, 8–11, 14, 15, 16)
- Rubén Castro – engineering assistance (tracks 1, 7, 8, 10, 11, 12, 14, 15)
- Daniel Cullen – engineering assistance (tracks 1, 13)
- Stacy Abarca – engineering assistance (track 2)
- Brandon Hernandez – engineering assistance (tracks 4, 5, 7, 12, 13)
- Stephanie D'Arcy – engineering assistance (track 5)
- Nate Mingo – engineering assistance (track 9)
- Jean Paul Quintero – engineering assistance (track 16)

== Charts ==
Chart performance for Sincere
Chart (2024)	Peak position
Australian Albums (ARIA)	46
Australian Hip Hop/R&B Albums (ARIA)	11
Belgian Albums (Ultratop Flanders)	174
Canadian Albums (Billboard)	82
Dutch Albums (Album Top 100)	71
New Zealand Albums (RMNZ)	27
Portuguese Albums (AFP)	104
Swiss Albums (Schweizer Hitparade)	39
UK Album Downloads (Official Charts)	33
US Billboard 200	43
US Top R&B/Hip-Hop Albums (Billboard)	11
