= New Normal (song) =

2021 single by Khalid

Single by Khalid
- Released: July 21, 2021
- Genre: Pop; R&B
- Length: 3:18
- Label: RCA
- Songwriter(s): Khalid Robinson; John Hill; Patrick Grossi
- Producer(s): Hill; Active Child; Blanda

Khalid singles chronology
"Working" (2021)	"New Normal" (2021)	"Present" (2021)

Music video
- "New Normal" on YouTube

"New Normal" is a song by American singer-songwriter Khalid, released through RCA Records on July 21, 2021. The song was produced by John Hill, Active Child, and Blanda.

== Background and composition ==
Khalid told press that the inspiration of "New Normal" comes from "the pandemic and the emotional toll that quarantine took on me and my friends". Khalid also told Rolling Stone that he started to write the song in the beginning of the COVID-19 pandemic and it "was my way of coping with the misunderstanding" and he also felt that it shows who he is as a person and "it just embodies hope for the outcome of our future". He also explained his inspiration for the song:

Around this time last year, I was super fascinated and gravitated towards space. I was watching this comet by the name of Neowise last year, and space travel is something I've always been interested in as well. And I've been going through the motions of understanding this new, postmodern future that's coming together, especially when it comes down to technology – it's something that really excites me.

On July 8, 2021, Khalid announced the song along with its cover art and release date. He performed it live for the Virgin Galactic Unity 22 Spaceflight Launch on July 11, 2021. "New Normal" has been described as a "groovy, moody pop-R&B" song.

== Music video ==
The official music video premiered alongside the song on July 21, 2021. It shows a reference to Silicon Valley and shows a bunch of modern items, such as "skyscraper gardens, autonomous vehicles, drone deliveries, and smart homes". The music video also shows Khalid's PlayStation 5. Andrew J. Hawkins of The Verge described the song "as smooth and breezy as a summer afternoon, which is weird because the video that accompanies the track is pretty much a venture capitalist's dream come true".

== Credits and personnel ==
Credits adapted from Tidal.

- Khalid – vocals, songwriting
- John Hill – production, songwriting
- Active Child – production, songwriting
- Blanda – production
- Denis Kosiak – mixing, engineering, vocal production
- Connor Hedge – assistant engineering
- Fili Filizzola – assistant engineering
- Hector Vega – assistant engineering
- Dale Becker – mastering

== Charts ==
Chart performance for "New Normal"
Chart (2021)	Peak position
Australia (ARIA)	87
Canada (Canadian Hot 100)	69
Global 200 (Billboard)	120
Ireland (IRMA)	88
New Zealand Hot Singles (RMNZ)	8
Sweden (Sverigetopplistan)	62
US Bubbling Under Hot 100 (Billboard)	2
US Rhythmic (Billboard)	35

== Release history ==
Release dates and formats for "New Normal"
Region	Date	Format(s)	Label	Ref.
Various	July 21, 2021	Digital download; streaming	RCA	
United States	August 3, 2021	Contemporary hit radio	RCA	
United States	August 3, 2021	Rhythmic contemporary radio	RCA	
