= Oskar med k =

Norwegian record producer

oskar med k
- Born: Oskar Sjåvåg; 1999 (age 26–27)
- Origin: Oslo, Norway
- Genres: House; electronic
- Occupation: Record producer
- Years active: 2023–present
- Label: 7cult

Oskar Sjåvåg, known professionally as oskar med k, is a Norwegian electronic dance music producer most known for his breakthrough single "Make Me Feel". He later released the official remix with singer Khalid. It also appeared on Khalid's fourth album, After the Sun Goes Down, on October 10, 2025. Both tracks reached inside the UK, Swiss, and German charts.

== Early life ==
Oskar was born and raised in Oslo, Norway and started making music for fun when he was a teenager. He started on the DAW FL Studio and eventually moved to Logic Pro which he still uses today.

== Discography ==
=== Studio albums ===
List of studio albums, with title, release date, label, release formats and selected chart positions shown
Title	Album details	Peak chart positions	
Title	Album details	NOR	SWI
Keep Your Feet	Released: March 22, 2024; Label: 7Cult; Formats: Digital download, streaming	—	—
Feel	Released: March 27, 2026; Label: 7Cult; Formats: Digital download, streaming	35	75
"—" denotes an album that did not chart.

=== Extended plays ===
List of extended plays, with title, release date, label, and release formats shown
Title	EP details	Ref.
No Clouds	Released: November 3, 2023; Label: 7Cult; Formats: Digital download, streaming	

=== Singles ===
List of singles, with year released, selected chart positions and album details shown
Title	Year	Peak chart positions					Album
Title	Year	AUS	IRE	NZ Hot	UK	US Dance/ Mix	Album
"Rain" (featuring Marini)	2023	—	—	—	—	—	No Clouds
"How Far"	2023	—	—	—	—	—	No Clouds
"Do You"	2023	—	—	—	—	—	No Clouds
"Two Shots Too Much"	2024	—	—	—	—	—	Keep Your Feet
"Alone" (featuring Marini)	2024	—	—	—	—	—	Keep Your Feet
"Belong to One"	2024	—	—	—	—	—	Keep Your Feet
"Knock Me Off My Feet"	2025	—	—	—	—	—	Non-album singles
"Too Tense"	2025	—	—	—	—	—	Non-album singles
"Can't Find You" (with Avaion)	2025	—	—	—	—	—	To Make People Happy
"Make Me Feel"	2025	78	35	29	29	1	Feel
"Nobody (Make Me Feel)" (with Khalid)	2025	— (Note: "Nobody (Make Me Feel)" (with Khalid) did not enter the ARIA Top 100 Singles Chart, but did peak at number 12 on the ARIA Top 40 Hip Hop/R&B Singles Chart on 20 October 2025.)	—	20	—	—	After the Sun Goes Down (Note: "Nobody (Make Me Feel)" was also included on some digital editions of After the Sun Goes Down.)
"I Think I'm Addicted" (featuring Haley Joelle)	2025	—	—	6	—	1	Feel
"On the Ground"	2026	—	—	11	—	—	Feel
"Say No Prayer" (with Izzy Bizu)	2026	—	—	27	—	—	Feel
"I'm Way Too Self Aware"	2026	—	—	14	—	—	Non-album single
"—" denotes a single that did not chart or was not released in that territory.

== Accolades ==
Oskar med k has been recognized in various awards ceremonies, receiving one nomination at the Electronic Dance Music Awards, one at the Norwegian P3 Gull Music Awards, and two nominations at the Spellemannprisen, winning one for "Breakthrough of the Year" in 2026.

List of awards and nominations received by oskar med k
Year	Award	Category	Nominated work	Result	Ref.
2026	Electronic Dance Music Awards	House Song of the Year	"Make Me Feel"	Nominated	
2026	P3 Gull	Song of the Year	"Make Me Feel"	Nominated	
2026	Spellemannprisen	International Success of the Year	Himself	Nominated	
2026	Spellemannprisen	Breakthrough of the Year	"Make Me Feel"	Won	
