= After the Sun Goes Down =

Studio album by Khalid
- Released: October 10, 2025
- Genre: R&B
- Length: 49:59
- Label: RCA
- Producers: Ilya; BloodPop; Darkchild; Elvira Anderfjärd; Grant Boutin; Jack Lawson; Jason Gill; LIOHN; Luka Kloser; Mattman & Robin; Oscar Görres; Oscar Holter; Pete Nappi; Ryan Tedder; Savan Kotecha; Tove Lo

Khalid chronology
Sincere (2024)	After the Sun Goes Down (2025)

Singles from After the Sun Goes Down
- 1. "In Plain Sight" Released: August 15, 2025; 2. "Out of Body" Released: September 26, 2025; 3. "Nah" Released: October 9, 2025

After the Sun Goes Down (stylized in all lowercase) is the fourth studio album by American singer Khalid. It follows his third studio album, Sincere (2024), and was released through RCA Records on October 10, 2025. Preceded by the singles "In Plain Sight" and "Out of Body," major influences on the record included female R&B and pop artists such as Rihanna, Britney Spears, and Janet Jackson, as well as the overall pop music scene during the 2000s and early 2010s. The album is primarily rooted in R&B, while also containing elements of dance and pop music.

== Background ==
My new era of music feels like I'm finally ready to be the artist I've always dreamt of being. It goes back to the regressions of when I was a child—imagining myself and thinking, 'I want to be this artist one day.' Now I feel like I have the confidence to finally be that artist.

— Khalid, for his 2025 Billboard cover story

After getting outed by an ex on the social platform X (formerly known as Twitter) in November 2024, Khalid confessed to Paper, "I thought I'd be devastated when the world found out I was gay. That was something I always feared". He retrospectively named it a "blessing in disguise" but the outing itself was "so nasty". For the new album, he got to authentically be himself, where during Sincere he was healing and tapped into his vulnerability, but Sun Goes Down was extrovert and "about who I am and my place in my community".

On August 15, 2025, Khalid announced his new album, which was executive produced by Ilya Salmanzadeh. He explained in a press release, "This chapter is about taking my power back, living in my truth, and being able to express myself freely. I'm excited for my fans to experience this new era with me, not just musically, but personally". Alongside the announcement was the release of the album's lead single, "In Plain Sight," with the music video directed by 91 Rules. The album's second single, "Out of Body," was released on September 26, 2025. The accompanying music video was directed by Levi Turner. He released a VR music video for "Nah" on October 9, 2025.

== Critical reception ==
Professional ratings
Review scores
Source	Rating
AllMusic	3.5/5 stars
The Irish Times	4/5 stars

Andy Kellman of AllMusic wrote in his assessment, "These full-blown pop moves foster a greater emphasis on hooks and enunciation, another major development for Khalid. Whenever he sounds like the somnolent mumbler of yore, it seems more likely an effect of a long night out than one of lonesome doomscrolling. A weight has been lifted". Ed Power of The Irish Times called it a "gorgeously gauzy" record where Khalid "basks in the glow of love and freedom". Mark Kennedy, writing for Associated Press, gave a favorable review. He likened some tracks to fit on a Troye Sivan record and how Khalid's openness gave his music more directness.

== Track listing ==
All tracks are written by Khalid Robinson, with co-writers noted.

After the Sun Goes Down track listing
No.	Title	Writer(s)	Producer(s)	Length
1.	"Medicine"	Brandon Blatz; Ilya Salmanzadeh; Juan Argüello	Ilya	2:55
2.	"In Plain Sight"	Salmanzadeh; Mattias Larsson; Robin Fredriksson; Savan Kotecha	Ilya; Mattman & Robin; Kotecha	2:25
3.	"Nah"	Salmanzadeh; Oscar Görres; Pablo Bowman; Rami Yacoub	Ilya; Görres	2:43
4.	"Impulsive"	Michael Tucker; Bowman; Rickard Göransson	BloodPop; Ilya; Göransson	2:42
5.	"Out of Body"	Rodney Jerkins	Jack Lawson; Darkchild	2:55
6.	"Please Don't Call (333)"	Grant Boutin; Michael Pollack; Ryan Tedder	Boutin; Tedder	2:28
7.	"Tank Top"	Salmanzadeh; Görres; Tove Lo	Ilya; Görres	2:37
8.	"Whenever You're Gone"	Salmanzadeh; Robin Weisse; Görres	Ilya; Görres	3:52
9.	"Dumbstruck"	Salmanzadeh; Richard Zastenker; Kotecha	Ilya; LIOHN	2:40
10.	"Rendezvous"	Salmanzadeh; Jason Gill; Bowman	Ilya; Gill	3:05
11.	"True"	Salmanzadeh; Kotecha	Ilya	3:25
12.	"Instant"	Salmanzadeh; Görres; Lo	Ilya; Görres	3:52
13.	"Momentary Lovers"	Salmanzadeh; Elvira Anderfjärd; Luka Kloser	Ilya; Anderfjärd; Kloser	3:24
14.	"Yes No Maybe"	Salmanzadeh; Julia Michaels; Pete Nappi	Ilya; Nappi	3:27
15.	"Angel Boy"	Salmanzadeh; Michaels; Kloser	Ilya; Kloser	3:00
16.	"Hurt People"	Salmanzadeh; Oscar Holter; Yacoub; Kotecha	Ilya; Oscar Holter	4:29
Total length:				49:59

Alternate digital edition bonus track
No.	Title	Writer(s)	Producer(s)	Length
17.	"Nobody (Make Me Feel)" (with oskar med k)	Griff Clawson; Pollack; Oskar Sjåvåg	Clawson; Pollack; Sjåvåg	2:45
Total length:				52:44

=== Notes ===
- All track titles are stylized in lowercase.
- "Nobody (Make Me Feel)" is only included on some digital releases.

== Personnel ==
Credits adapted from Tidal.

=== Musicians ===
- Khalid – vocals
- Ilya – background vocals (1–3, 8–11, 15), synthesizers (all tracks), programming (all tracks)
- Juan Argüello – bass (1, 11)
- Mattman & Robin – background vocals, bass, drums, keyboards, percussion, programming, synthesizer (2)
- Oscar Görres – background vocals (3), guitar (3, 7, 12), bass, drums, keyboards, synthesizer, programming (3, 7–8, 12)
- BloodPop – drums, programming (4)
- Rickard Göransson – bass, drums, programming (4)
- Grant Boutin – bass, drum machine, keyboards, synthesizer, programming (6)
- Richard Zastenker – bass, drums, keyboards, synthesizer, programming (9)
- Luka Kloser – background vocals (11, 13, 15)
- Pete Nappi – bass (14)
- Linda Wolfe – background vocals (16)
- Griff Clawson – piano, synthesizer, drum programming (17)

=== Technical ===
- Randy Merrill – mastering
- Serban Ghenea – mixing
- Bryce Bordone – engineering (all tracks), mixing (17)
- Peter Carlsson – vocal production (1, 9, 13)
- Juan Argüello – engineering (2–4, 7–16)
- Brandon Blatz – engineering assistance (2–3, 7–12)
- Sierra Sparrow – engineering assistance (4, 13, 16)
- Denis Kosiak – vocal production (4, 14)
- Anna Parks – recording engineer (5)
- Grant Boutin – recording, vocal production (6)
- Richard Zastenker – vocal production (9)
- Jeremy Lertola – engineering assistance (9)
- Daniel Adame – engineering assistance (16)
- Griff Clawson – vocal production, engineering, vocal engineering (17)
- Michael Pollack – vocal production, engineering (17)

== Charts ==
Chart performance for After the Sun Goes Down
Chart (2025)	Peak position
Australian Albums (ARIA)	59
Australian Hip Hop/R&B Albums (ARIA)	11
US Billboard 200	136
US Top R&B/Hip-Hop Albums (Billboard)	41
