= Scenic Drive (mixtape) =

Mixtape by Khalid
- Released: December 3, 2021
- Genre: R&B; hip-hop soul
- Length: 28:40
- Label: RCA

Khalid chronology
Free Spirit (2019)	Scenic Drive (2021)	Sincere (2024)

Singles from Scenic Drive
- 1. "Present" Released: October 22, 2021

Professional ratings
Review scores
Source	Rating
Pitchfork	5.6/10

Scenic Drive is the first mixtape by American singer Khalid, released on December 3, 2021, by RCA Records. Originally planned to release as an extended play, Khalid tweeted shortly after announcing Scenic Drive that "this is no longer an EP, it's way more special to me".

== Singles ==
The lead single from the mixtape, "Present" was released on October 22, 2021.

== Critical reception ==
A.D. Amorosi of Variety called it "a pulsating, minor marvel of economical soul-hop that satisfies all that Khalid fanatics have come to crave - that high dozy warble, those out-of-the-blue hooks - while pushing his new-found exigency (and lower range) into the future."

== Track listing ==
Scenic Drive track listing
No.	Title	Writer(s)	Producer(s)	Length
1.	"Intro" (featuring Alicia Keys)	Khalid Robinson		1:12
2.	"Present"	Robinson; Milan Modi; Malita Rice; Ryan Vojtesak; Jonathan Hoskins; Leon Krol; James Maddocks	Charlie Handsome; Jon Hoskins; L.N.K.; James Maddocks; Denis Kosiak^{[v]}	2:36
3.	"Backseat"	Robinson; Justin Lucas; Jamil Chammas; Simon Rosen	Digi; Simon Says; Kosiak^{[v]}	2:54
4.	"Retrograde" (featuring 6lack and Lucky Daye)	Robinson; Denis Kosiak; Khirye Tyler; Andrew DeCaro; David Brown; Ricardo Valentine Jr.	Tyler; Falconry; Kosiak	3:40
5.	"Brand New" (featuring Quin)	Robinson; Michael "Scribz" Riley; Bianca Quinones	Scribz Riley; Kosiak^{[v]}	2:51
6.	"All I Feel Is Rain" (featuring JID)	Robinson; Chammas; Kevin White; Destin Route	Digi; White; Kosiak^{[v]}	3:24
7.	"Voicemail" (featuring Kiana Ledé)	Robinson; Kosiak; Mark Landon; Jeff Villaluna	M-Phazes; Villaluna; Kosiak^{[v]}	4:07
8.	"Open" (featuring Majid Jordan)	Robinson; Kosiak; Jordan Ullman; Majid Al-Maskati; Quentin Gulledge; Chris Payton; Tyler; Steve Thornton II	Tyler; Thornton II; Ullman; Gulledge^{[m]}; Payton^{[m]}; Kosiak^{[v]}	3:47
9.	"Scenic Drive" (featuring Smino and Ari Lennox)	Robinson; Kenneth Blume; Nathan Perez; Christopher Smith Jr.; Courtney Salter	Kenny Beats; Happy Perez; Kosiak^{[v]}	4:09
Total length:				28:40

== Charts ==
Chart performance for Scenic Drive
Chart (2021)	Peak position
Australian Albums (ARIA)	62
Canadian Albums (Billboard)	51
Lithuanian Albums (AGATA)	96
New Zealand Albums (RMNZ)	37
Swiss Albums (Schweizer Hitparade)	94
US Billboard 200	54
US Top R&B/Hip-Hop Albums (Billboard)	24
