= Silence (Marshmello song) =

Single by Marshmello featuring Khalid
- Released: August 11, 2017
- Genre: Dance
- Length: 3:00
- Label: RCA
- Songwriters: Khalid Robinson; Christopher Comstock
- Producer: Marshmello

Marshmello singles chronology
| "Love U" (2017) | "Silence" (2017) | "You & Me" (2017) |

Khalid singles chronology
| "Young Dumb & Broke" (2017) | "Silence" (2017) | "Homemade Dynamite (Remix)" (2017) |

Music video
- "Silence" on YouTube

"Silence" is a song produced by American DJ and musician Marshmello featuring vocals from American singer-songwriter Khalid. Written by both, it was released by RCA Records on August 11, 2017. The dance track peaked at number 30 on the Billboard Hot 100 as well as number 3 on the UK charts, his first song to chart on the latter.

== Background ==
On August 1, 2017, Marshmello made a surprise performance at a Khalid concert, hinting at an upcoming collaboration. On August 7, 2017, Marshmello first teased the single release with a photo of him and Khalid, captioning the single's title and release date.

In an interview with StarTribune, Khalid explains "the song reflects the dejection he said he felt moving around a lot as a kid, since his mom served in the military. (His dad died in a car accident at a young age)".

== Critical reception ==
David Rishty of Billboard described the song as "a rumbling dance ballad that has the ingredients to take both acts to new heights in their flourishing careers". He opined that Khalid delivered "crooning, soulful vocals", while Marshmello's production is "vibrant" and "asserts simplicity, yet purpose". Erik of EDM Sauce called the song "an incredibly powerful track", and described Khalid's vocals as "booming and impressive". He wrote that "after the intense build up and lyrical perfection from Khalid we wanted an equally as impressive drop", but "we did not find it". Alex Ross of Vice called the song "a good Marshmello song", and wrote that Marshmello "cheated by getting Khalid to do the vocals". He thinks that it "sounds a bit like" Major Lazer's collaboration with Justin Bieber and MØ, "Cold Water". Rolling Stone wrote that the song has "shifting, snapping synths". Rap-Up felt that the song "blends soulful R&B with atmospheric electronic sounds". Broadway World described Khalid's vocals as "strong emotive", and thinks that Marshmello "adopted a slower tempo than his usual upbeat productions to give the release a silky smooth feel, before launching into his instantly recognisable chord-based drop".

== Personnel ==
Credits adapted from Tidal.

- Marshmello – production
- Chris Galland – mix engineering
- Manny Marroquin – mix engineering
- Denis Kosiak – engineering
- Jeff Jackson – assistant engineering
- Robin Florent – assistant engineering

== Charts ==
=== Weekly charts ===
Weekly chart performance for "Silence"
| Chart (2017–2018) | Peak position |
|---|---|
| Australia (ARIA) | 5 |
| Australia Dance (ARIA) | 1 |
| Austria (Ö3 Austria Top 40) | 8 |
| Belgium (Ultratop 50 Flanders) | 5 |
| Belgium (Ultratop 50 Wallonia) | 26 |
| Canada Hot 100 (Billboard) | 7 |
| Canada Rock (Billboard) | 50 |
| Czech Republic Airplay (ČNS IFPI) | 89 |
| Czech Republic Singles Digital (ČNS IFPI) | 14 |
| Denmark (Tracklisten) | 7 |
| Finland (Suomen virallinen lista) | 20 |
| France (SNEP) | 70 |
| Germany (GfK) | 6 |
| Hungary (Rádiós Top 40) | 23 |
| Hungary (Single Top 40) | 30 |
| Hungary (Stream Top 40) | 8 |
| Ireland (IRMA) | 4 |
| Italy (FIMI) | 45 |
| Latvia Streaming (LaIPA) | 6 |
| Lebanon (Lebanese Top 20) | 8 |
| Malaysia (RIM) | 10 |
| Netherlands (Dutch Top 40) | 15 |
| Netherlands (Single Top 100) | 11 |
| New Zealand (Recorded Music NZ) | 3 |
| Norway (VG-lista) | 2 |
| Philippines (Philippine Hot 100) | 18 |
| Poland Airplay (ZPAV) | 29 |
| Portugal (AFP) | 6 |
| Scottish Singles Sales (Official Charts) | 3 |
| Slovakia Singles Digital (ČNS IFPI) | 11 |
| Spain (PROMUSICAE) | 44 |
| Sweden (Sverigetopplistan) | 5 |
| Switzerland (Schweizer Hitparade) | 20 |
| UK Singles (Official Charts) | 3 |
| UK Dance (Official Charts) | 1 |
| US Billboard Hot 100 | 30 |
| US Dance Club Songs (Billboard) | 1 |
| US Hot Dance/Electronic Songs (Billboard) | 1 |
| US Pop Airplay (Billboard) | 31 |
| US Rhythmic Airplay (Billboard) | 26 |

=== Year-end charts ===
2017 year-end chart performance for "Silence"
| Chart (2017) | Position |
|---|---|
| Australia (ARIA) | 50 |
| Austria (Ö3 Austria Top 40) | 54 |
| Belgium (Ultratop Flanders) | 79 |
| Canada (Canadian Hot 100) | 68 |
| Denmark (Tracklisten) | 55 |
| Germany (Official German Charts) | 45 |
| Hungary (Stream Top 40) | 28 |
| Latvia Airplay (LaIPA) | 89 |
| Netherlands (Dutch Top 40) | 69 |
| Netherlands (Single Top 100) | 72 |
| New Zealand (Recorded Music NZ) | 49 |
| Portugal (AFP) | 50 |
| Sweden (Sverigetopplistan) | 35 |
| UK Singles (OCC) | 57 |
| US Hot Dance/Electronic Songs (Billboard) | 16 |
| US Streaming Songs (Billboard) | 75 |

2018 year-end chart performance for "Silence"
| Chart (2018) | Position |
|---|---|
| Australia (ARIA) | 30 |
| Austria (Ö3 Austria Top 40) | 49 |
| Belgium (Ultratop Flanders) | 34 |
| Canada (Canadian Hot 100) | 28 |
| Denmark (Tracklisten) | 54 |
| Estonia (IFPI) | 45 |
| Germany (Official German Charts) | 75 |
| Netherlands (Dutch Top 40) | 190 |
| New Zealand (Recorded Music NZ) | 35 |
| Portugal (AFP) | 35 |
| Sweden (Sverigetopplistan) | 67 |
| Switzerland (Schweizer Hitparade) | 91 |
| UK Singles (OCC) | 69 |
| US Hot Dance/Electronic Songs (Billboard) | 5 |

=== Decade-end charts ===
Decade-end chart performance for "Silence"
| Chart (2010–2019) | Position |
|---|---|
| US Hot Dance/Electronic Songs (Billboard) | 18 |

== Certifications ==
Certifications and sales for "Silence"
| Region | Certification | Certified units/sales |
|---|---|---|
| Australia (ARIA) | 7× Platinum | 490,000^{‡} |
| Austria (IFPI Austria) | Platinum | 30,000^{‡} |
| Belgium (BRMA) | 2× Platinum | 40,000^{‡} |
| Brazil (Pro-Música Brasil) | Diamond | 250,000^{‡} |
| Canada (Music Canada) | 9× Platinum | 720,000^{‡} |
| Denmark (IFPI Danmark) | 3× Platinum | 270,000^{‡} |
| France (SNEP) | Diamond | 333,333^{‡} |
| Germany (BVMI) | 2× Platinum | 800,000^{‡} |
| Italy (FIMI) | Platinum | 50,000^{‡} |
| Mexico (AMPROFON) | 2× Platinum+Gold | 150,000^{‡} |
| New Zealand (RMNZ) | 7× Platinum | 210,000^{‡} |
| Poland (ZPAV) | 2× Platinum | 40,000^{‡} |
| Portugal (AFP) | Platinum | 10,000^{‡} |
| Spain (Promusicae) | Platinum | 60,000^{‡} |
| Switzerland (IFPI Switzerland) | 2× Platinum | 40,000^{‡} |
| United Kingdom (BPI) | 3× Platinum | 1,800,000^{‡} |
| United States (RIAA) | 6× Platinum | 6,000,000^{‡} |
Streaming
| Sweden (GLF) | 5× Platinum | 40,000,000^{†} |
^{‡} Sales+streaming figures based on certification alone.^{†} Streaming-only figures based on certification alone.

== See also ==
- List of number-one dance singles of 2017 (U.S.)
