= Khalid (singer) =

American singer (born 1998)

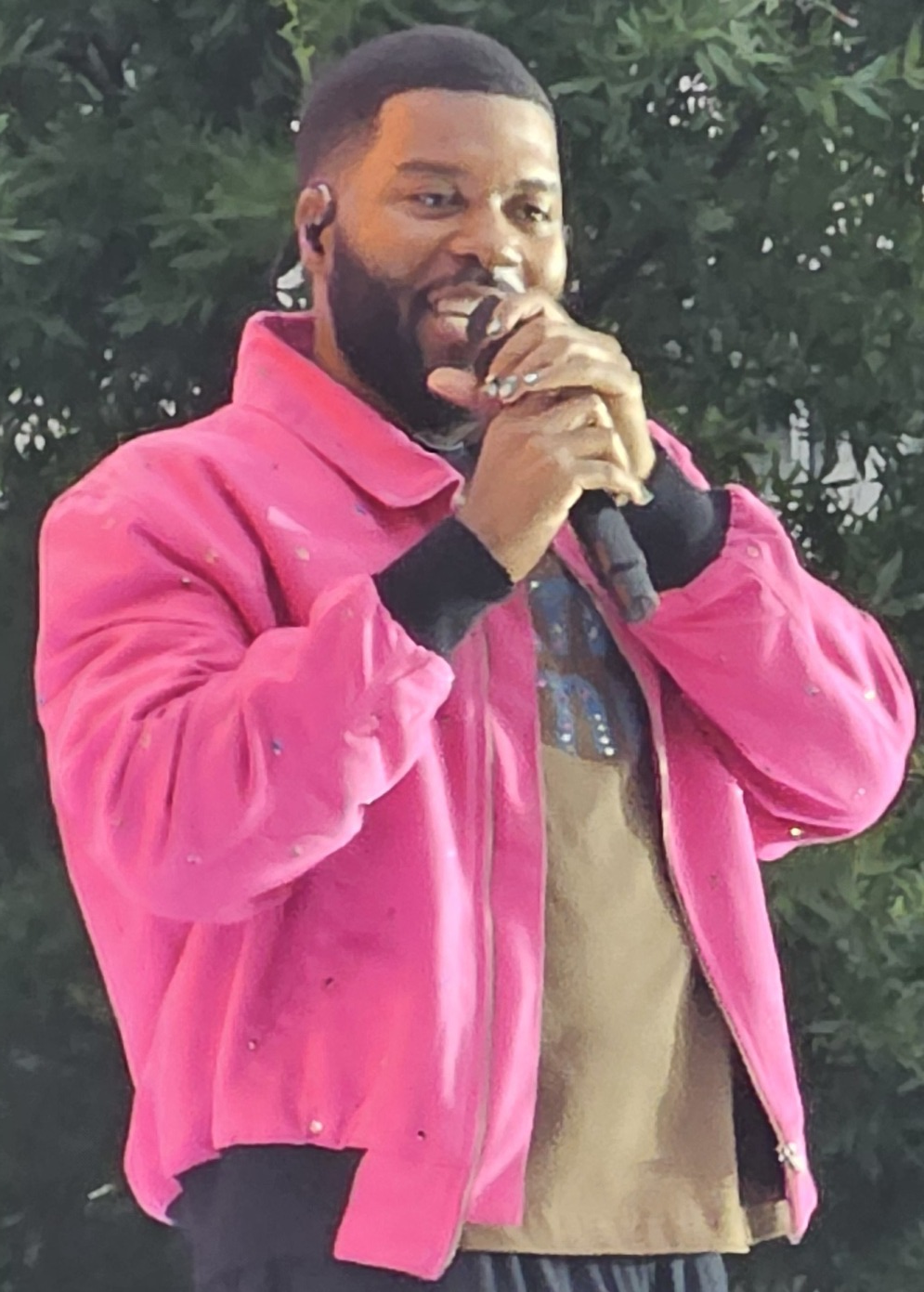
- Khalid performing in 2025

Background information
- Born: Khalid Donnel Robinson; February 11, 1998 (age 28); Fort Stewart, Georgia, U.S.
- Origin: El Paso, Texas, U.S.
- Genres: R&B; pop; hip-hop
- Occupations: Singer; songwriter
- Works: Khalid discography
- Years active: 2014–present
- Labels: Right Hand; RCA
- Website: khalidofficial.com

Khalid Donnel Robinson (born February 11, 1998), known professionally as Khalid (/kəˈliːd/ kə-LEED), is an American singer and songwriter from El Paso, Texas. He signed with Courtney Stewart's Right Hand Music Group, an imprint of RCA Records to release his 2016 debut single, "Location" and its 2017 follow-up, "Young Dumb & Broke". Both songs peaked within the top 20 of the Billboard Hot 100, received diamond certifications by the Recording Industry Association of America (RIAA), and preceded the release of his debut studio album, American Teen (2017). A critical and commercial success, it received quadruple platinum certification by the RIAA and was nominated for Best Urban Contemporary Album at the 60th Annual Grammy Awards.

In April 2017, Khalid guest performed alongside Alessia Cara on Logic's hit single "1-800-273-8255", which earned him a Grammy Award nomination for Song of the Year. Robinson's 2018 singles, "Love Lies" (with Normani) and "Eastside" (with Benny Blanco and Halsey), both achieved the record for longest-charting songs within the Mainstream Top 40 chart, and peaked within the Billboard Hot 100's top ten. Later that year, he released his third top-ten single, "Better", which preceded his debut extended play (EP) Suncity. His second studio album, Free Spirit (2019), debuted atop the Billboard 200; its lead single, "Talk", peaked at number three on the Billboard Hot 100, becoming his highest-charting song thus far, and earned him a Grammy Award nomination for Record of the Year.

Khalid has received numerous accolades, including six Grammy Award nominations, six Billboard Music Awards, three American Music Awards, and a MTV Video Music Award. In 2019, Khalid was named one of Time magazine's 100 Most Influential People.

== Early life ==
Khalid Donnel Robinson was born on February 11, 1998, at Fort Stewart, Georgia. He moved frequently during his childhood due to his parents' military careers. The family lived in Fort Campbell in Kentucky, Fort Drum in Watertown, New York, and spent six years in Heidelberg, Germany. His father passed away during his childhood. His mother, Linda Wolfe, worked as a supply technician and became a member of the Army chorus. In high school, Khalid studied singing and musical theater. He attended Carthage Central High School in Carthage, New York, for his first three years of high school before he and his mother moved to El Paso, Texas, where he attended Americas High School for his senior year; there, he was elected Prom King and voted Most Likely to Go Platinum.

== Career ==
=== 2014–2017: American Teen ===
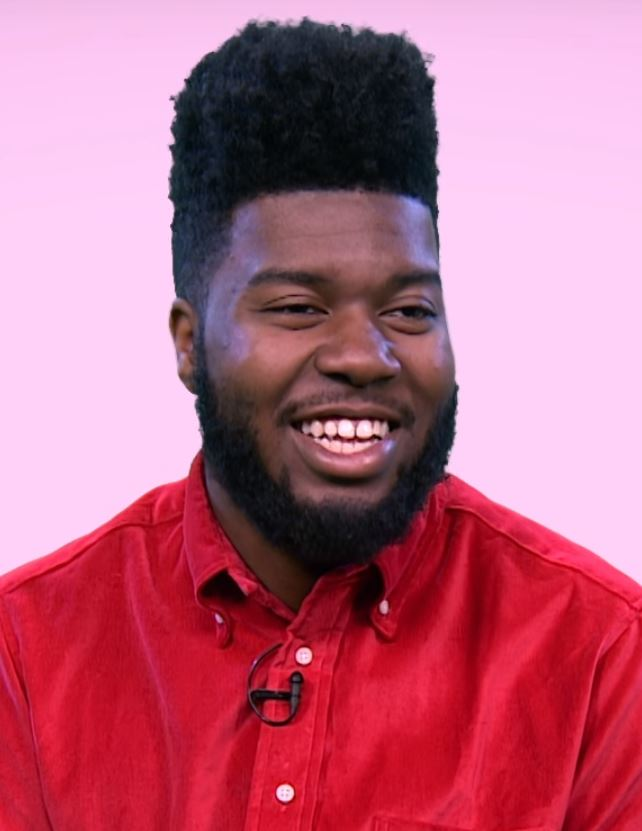
Khalid in 2017

Khalid began writing and creating music in high school; he posted his early works to SoundCloud. Shortly after graduating from Americas High School, Khalid reached number two on the Billboard Twitter Emerging Artists chart in July 2016. His single "Location" began charting, which led to him being featured in many publications, including Billboard, Yahoo!, BuzzFeed, and Rolling Stone. With production from Syk Sense, Tunji Ige, and Smash David, "Location" finished the year of 2016 at number 20 on the US Mainstream R&B/Hip-Hop Airplay chart and reached the Top 10 on the US Hot R&B Songs chart on January 21, 2017. The music video for "Location" premiered on The Fader's website. The album's second single "Young Dumb & Broke" became a sleeper hit, becoming a hit at rhythmic formats and crossing over to pop radio into early 2018.

In January 2017, Alina Baraz's single "Electric", featuring Khalid, was released. His collaboration with Brasstracks, called "Whirlwind", was part of the Yours Truly & Adidas Originals Songs from Scratch series, and received over 700,000 SoundCloud plays. Khalid contributed uncredited vocals to Kendrick Lamar's song "The Heart Part 4", released on March 24, 2017. On April 28, 2017, Logic released the single "1-800-273-8255", which featured Khalid and Alessia Cara; the single peaked at number three on the Billboard Hot 100, making it Khalid's highest-charting single.

He sold out every venue on his 21-city January–February 2017 Location Tour, including the 1,500-capacity Tricky Falls in El Paso, Texas. Following the completion of the tour, his debut studio album American Teen was released on March 3, 2017. The album received critical acclaim and Grammy Award nominations for Best Urban Contemporary Album and Best R&B Song (for "Location"), at the 2018 ceremony. On October 24, 2017, the album was certified platinum by the Recording Industry Association of America (RIAA) for selling over 1,000,000 in combined pure sales and album-equivalent units.

In 2017, Khalid won a VMA Award for Best New Artist. Khalid made his television debut performing "Location" on The Tonight Show Starring Jimmy Fallon on March 15, 2017, backed by the Roots. His song "Angels" was featured on the ABC drama series Grey's Anatomy in the episode titled "Don't Stop Me Now", which aired on April 27, 2017. In September 2018, El Paso Mayor Dee Margo Friday presented Khalid with the key to the City of El Paso.

Khalid's next single was a collaboration with American DJ Marshmello titled "Silence", which was released on August 11, 2017, via RCA Records. The song appeared on the Top 200 in over 28 countries. It topped the Dance charts in Australia, the United Kingdom, and the United States, and charted in the Top 10 of more than fifteen countries such as Germany, Sweden and Norway. It also appeared on the year-end charts of Hungary, Denmark, Austria, Belgium, and the Netherlands. It was also certified 5× platinum by the RIAA and platinum or multiplatinum in many countries including the United Kingdom, Germany, Belgium, New Zealand, Canada, Sweden, Australia, and others.

=== 2018–2019: Suncity and Free Spirit ===
Khalid's song "The Ways" with rapper Swae Lee was featured in the Marvel film Black Panther. As of February 23, 2018, the song peaked at number 63 on the Billboard Hot 100. In 2017, he collaborated with Lorde, SZA, and Post Malone on Lorde's "Homemade Dynamite" remix. He released a duet with singer Normani, called "Love Lies", recorded for the Love, Simon film soundtrack, which reached the top ten of the Billboard Hot 100 in 2018. "Love Lies" was each artist's first number one on the US Pop Songs chart, and finished in the top 20 of the 2018 Billboard Hot 100 Year-End chart.

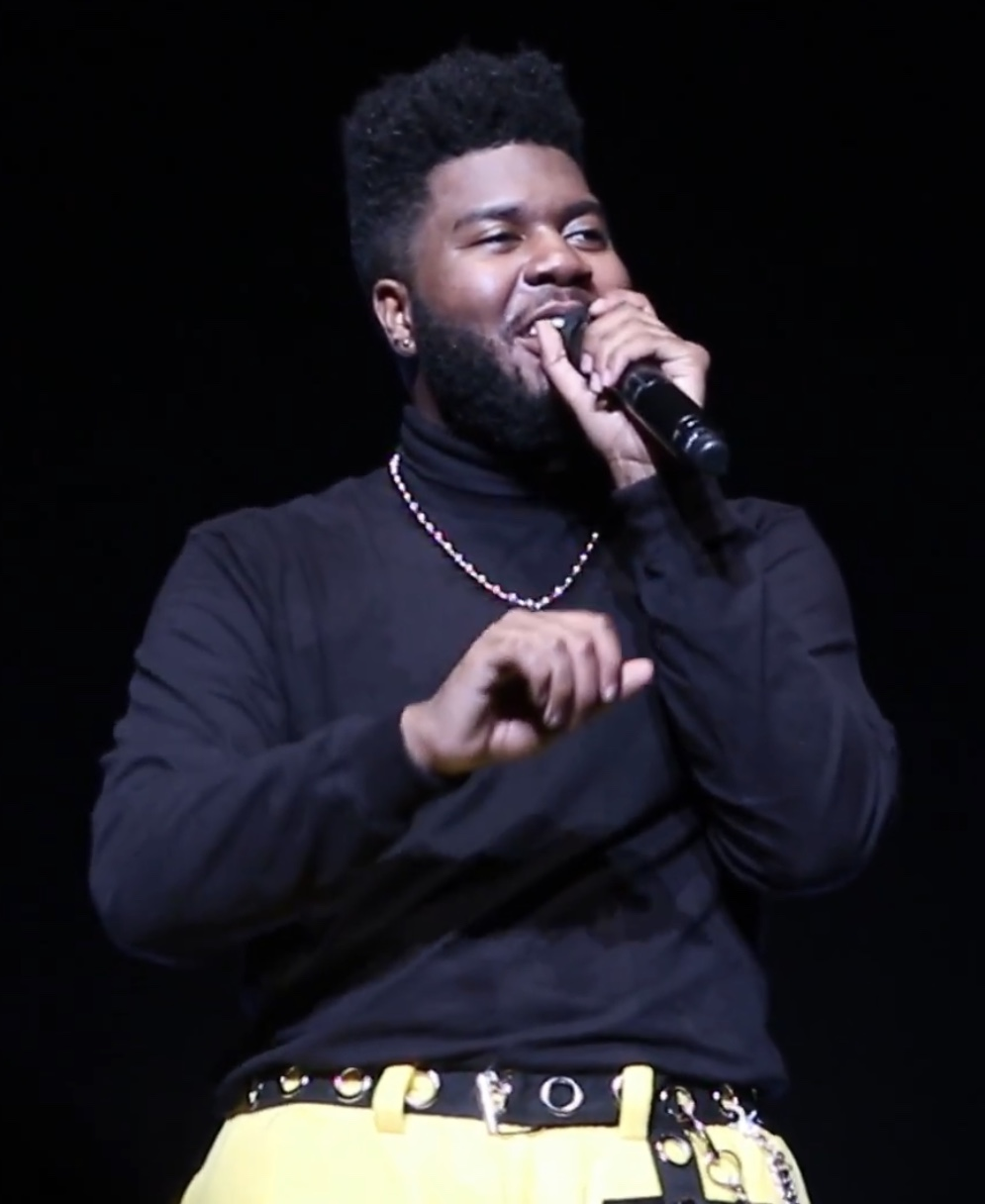
Khalid performing in 2018

In May 2018, he wrote "Youth" in collaboration with Canadian singer Shawn Mendes. The song was featured on Mendes' self-titled album and contains references to the social and political climate at that time. Mendes and Khalid performed "Youth" at the 2018 Billboard Music Awards on May 20, 2018, as a tribute to the victims of gun violence. The performance featured the show choir from Marjory Stoneman Douglas High School.

Khalid wrote and provided vocals for DJ and record producer Martin Garrix's song "Ocean", released through Stmpd Rcrds on June 15, 2018. It peaked at number 78 on the Billboard Hot 100, number 5 on the Dance/Electronic Songs chart, and finished at number 16 on its 2018-year end chart, then number 81 the next year.

In 2018, Khalid collaborated with Billie Eilish on the song "Lovely". It was played on the popular Netflix series 13 Reasons Why in Season 2 Episode 13. In July 2018, he was featured alongside Halsey on Benny Blanco's debut single "Eastside". The song charted in the Billboard Hot 100's top ten and reached number one on the US Pop Songs chart, after a record 30-week climb. He also released a song called "Better" on September 14, the first day of two hometown shows. The song topped the Rhythmic Songs airplay ranking and charted in the top five at pop radio.

In October 2018, Khalid released an EP, Suncity, on October 19, 2018, through RCA Records. The EP debuted at number 8 on the Billboard 200. The album also spawned the song "Saturday Nights", later remixed to feature country artist Kane Brown.

In February 2019, Khalid released the single "Talk", and he made his debut on Saturday Night Live on March 9, 2019, performing "Talk" and "Better". His second studio album Free Spirit was released on April 5, 2019, along with an accompanying short film. It debuted atop the US Billboard 200 with 202,000 album-equivalent units (including 85,000 pure album sales) in its first week, becoming Khalid's first US number-one album.

On April 20, 2019, Khalid made history by becoming the first and only artist to occupy the entire top 5 of the Billboard R&B Songs chart.

On April 25, 2019, Billboard magazine reported that since March 2018, Khalid had landed a 59-week straight streak of hits (and counting) on the Hot 100 since his Normani collaboration "Love Lies" debuted on the chart. He charted 12 tracks (both solo hits and features) on the Hot 100 throughout the last year.

To promote the album, Khalid embarked on his fourth concert tour titled the Free Spirit World Tour on June 20, 2019. The tour visited North America, Europe, and Oceania and concluded on December 5, 2019. An Asian 9-show leg of the tour was announced on December 2, 2019, but was postponed due to the COVID-19 pandemic.

Following the release of Free Spirit, Khalid was reported to have become the biggest global artist on Spotify, hitting 50.4 million monthly listeners on the streaming platform, and subsequently surpassing Ariana Grande. In October 2019, Khalid and Major Lazer released a single titled "Trigger" which was also featured on Death Stranding's soundtrack.

=== 2020–present: Scenic Drive and Sincere ===
Khalid co-wrote Zayn's song "Outside" from his album "Nobody Is Listening" which released on January 15, 2021.

On July 11, 2021, Khalid premiered his single "New Normal" during Richard Branson's Virgin Galactic Unity 22 spaceflight at Spaceport America, New Mexico. He released his first mixtape Scenic Drive on December 3, 2021. On November 20, 2021, Khalid previewed a new song titled "Backseat", which serves as the third track on the mixtape. In 2023, he collaborated with singer Dove Cameron on the track "We Go Down Together". His song "Silver Platter" was featured on the soundtrack album for the film Barbie later that year.

On April 5, 2024, he released the single "Please Don't Fall in Love with Me". It was the first single on his third studio album, Sincere, which was released on August 2, 2024.

On August 15, 2025, Khalid released the single "In Plain Sight." It was the first single on his fourth studio album, After the Sun Goes Down, which was released on October 10, 2025.

== Personal life ==
On November 22, 2024, Khalid publicly confirmed that he is gay on the social media platform X after being outed. Responding to fans, he said that he had not been hiding his sexuality and considered it a private matter. In an October 2025 interview with People, which reported that he had been out to family and friends for years, Khalid said that being outed had influenced his album After the Sun Goes Down.

== Musical style and influences ==
Khalid's music has been described as R&B, pop, hip-hop, pop-soul, and bedroom pop. He sings in both the baritone and tenor ranges, effectively rendering him a baritenor. Khalid possesses a two and a half octave vocal range, ranging from the low F2 to the middle B♭4. Khalid cites his mother as his leading musical inspiration and has cited Zayn Malik, Kendrick Lamar, A$AP Rocky, Father John Misty, Frank Ocean, Grizzly Bear, Chance the Rapper, Lorde, India Arie, and James Blake as other influences.

== Discography ==
- American Teen (2017)
- Free Spirit (2019)
- Sincere (2024)
- After the Sun Goes Down (2025)

== Tours ==
Headlining

- The Location Tour (2017)
- American Teen Tour (2017–2018)
- Roxy Tour (2018)
- Free Spirit World Tour (2019)
- It’s Always Summer Somewhere Tour (2026)

Supporting

- Travis Scott – Birds Eye View Tour (2017)
- Lorde – Melodrama World Tour (2017)
- Ed Sheeran – +–=÷× Tour (2023)

== Awards and nominations ==
| Year | Award | Category | Work | Result | Ref. |
|---|---|---|---|---|---|
| 2017 | Woodie Awards | Woodie To Watch | Himself | Won | |
| 2017 | BET Awards | Best New Artist | Himself | Nominated | |
| 2017 | Teen Choice Awards | Choice R&B/Hip-Hop Song | "Location" | Nominated | |
| 2017 | MTV Video Music Awards | Best New Artist | Himself | Won | |
| 2017 | MTV Europe Music Awards | Best New Artist | Himself | Nominated | |
| 2017 | MTV Europe Music Awards | Best Push Artist | Himself | Nominated | |
| 2017 | American Music Awards | Favorite Song – Soul/R&B | "Location" | Nominated | |
| 2017 | Soul Train Music Awards | Best New Artist | Himself | Nominated | |
| 2017 | Soul Train Music Awards | Best R&B Soul Male Artist | Himself | Nominated | |
| 2017 | Soul Train Music Awards | Song of the Year | "Location" | Nominated | |
| 2017 | Soul Train Music Awards | The Ashford & Simpson Songwriter's Award | "Location" | Nominated | |
| 2018 | Grammy Awards | Best New Artist | Himself | Nominated | |
| 2018 | Grammy Awards | Best Urban Contemporary Album | American Teen | Nominated | |
| 2018 | Grammy Awards | Best R&B Song | "Location" | Nominated | |
| 2018 | Grammy Awards | Song of the Year | "1-800-273-8255"; (Logic featuring Alessia Cara and Khalid) | Nominated | |
| 2018 | Grammy Awards | Best Music Video | "1-800-273-8255"; (Logic featuring Alessia Cara and Khalid) | Nominated | |
| 2018 | GAFFA Awards (Denmark) | Best Foreign New Act | Himself | Won | |
| 2018 | iHeartRadio Music Awards | R&B Song of the Year | "Location" | Nominated | |
| 2018 | iHeartRadio Music Awards | R&B Artist of the Year | Himself | Nominated | |
| 2018 | iHeartRadio Music Awards | Best New R&B Artist | Himself | Won | |
| 2018 | iHeartRadio Music Awards | Best New Artist | Himself | Nominated | |
| 2018 | iHeartRadio Music Awards | Best Cover Song | "Lost" by Frank Ocean | Nominated | |
| 2018 | iHeartRadio Music Awards | Best Remix | "Homemade Dynamite"; (Lorde featuring Khalid, SZA and Post Malone) | Nominated | |
| 2018 | iHeartRadio Music Awards | R&B Album of the Year | American Teen | Won | |
| 2018 | Nickelodeon Kids' Choice Awards | Favorite Breakout Artist | Himself | Nominated | |
| 2018 | Billboard Music Awards | Top New Artist | Himself | Won | |
| 2018 | Billboard Music Awards | Top R&B Artist | Himself | Nominated | |
| 2018 | Billboard Music Awards | Top R&B Male Artist | Himself | Nominated | |
| 2018 | Billboard Music Awards | Top R&B Song | "Young, Dumb & Broke" | Nominated | |
| 2018 | Billboard Music Awards | Top R&B Album | American Teen | Nominated | |
| 2018 | BMI Pop Awards | Award Winning Songs | "1-800-273-8255" (Logic featuring Alessia Cara and Khalid) | Won | |
| 2018 | BET Awards | Best Male R&B/Pop Artist | Himself | Nominated | |
| 2018 | Teen Choice Awards | Choice R&B/Hip-Hop Artist | Himself | Nominated | |
| 2018 | Teen Choice Awards | Choice Breakout Artist | Himself | Won | |
| 2018 | Teen Choice Awards | Choice R&B/Hip-Hop Song | "Love Lies" (with Normani) | Won | |
| 2018 | MTV Video Music Awards | Push Artist of the Year | Himself | Nominated | |
| 2018 | MTV Video Music Awards | Video with a Message | "1-800-273-8255" (Logic featuring Alessia Cara and Khalid) | Nominated | |
| 2018 | MTV Video Music Awards | Best Collaboration | "1-800-273-8255" (Logic featuring Alessia Cara and Khalid) | Nominated | |
| 2018 | MTV Video Music Awards | Best Dance Video | "Silence" (with Marshmello) | Nominated | |
| 2018 | iHeartRadio Titanium Awards | 1 Billion Total Audience Spins on iHeartRadio Stations | "Love Lies" (with Normani) | Won | |
| 2018 | Soul Train Music Awards | Best R&B/Soul Male Artist | Himself | Nominated | |
| 2018 | Soul Train Music Awards | Best Collaboration Performance | "OTW" (with Ty Dolla Sign and 6lack) | Nominated | |
| 2019 | BET Awards | Best Male R&B/Pop Artist | Himself | Nominated | |
| 2019 | Billboard Music Awards | Top R&B Artist | Himself | Nominated | |
| 2019 | Billboard Music Awards | Top R&B Male Artist | Himself | Nominated | |
| 2019 | Billboard Music Awards | Top R&B Album | American Teen | Nominated | |
| 2019 | Billboard Music Awards | Top R&B Song | "Better" | Nominated | |
| 2019 | Billboard Music Awards | Top Collaboration | "Love Lies"; (with Normani) | Nominated | |
| 2019 | Billboard Music Awards | Top Radio Song | "Love Lies"; (with Normani) | Nominated | |
| 2019 | MTV Video Music Awards | Best Pop | "Talk" | Nominated | |
| 2019 | MTV Video Music Awards | Song of Summer | "Talk" | Nominated | |
| 2019 | Nickelodeon Kids' Choice Awards Abu Dhabi | Favorite International Star | Himself | Nominated | |
| 2019 | American Music Awards | Favorite Male Artist – Pop/Rock | Himself | Won | |
| 2019 | American Music Awards | Favorite Male Artist – Soul/R&B | Himself | Nominated | |
| 2019 | American Music Awards | Favorite Album – Soul/R&B | Free Spirit | Won | |
| 2019 | American Music Awards | Favorite Song – Soul/R&B | "Talk" | Won | |
| 2019 | iHeartRadio Titanium Awards | 1 Billion Total Audience Spins on iHeartRadio Stations | "Eastside" (with Benny Blanco and Halsey) | Won | |
| 2019 | Soul Train Music Awards | Best R&B/Soul Male Artist | Himself | Won | |
| 2019 | Soul Train Music Awards | Song of the Year | "Talk" | Nominated | |
| 2019 | Soul Train Music Awards | The Ashford & Simpson Songwriter's Award | "Talk" | Nominated | |
| 2019 | Soul Train Music Awards | Video of the Year | "Better" | Nominated | |
| 2019 | Soul Train Music Awards | Album/Mixtape of the Year | Free Spirit | Nominated | |
| 2020 | Grammy Awards | Record of the Year | "Talk" | Nominated | |
| 2020 | BET Awards | Best Male R&B/Pop Artist | Himself | Nominated | |
| 2020 | MTV Video Music Awards | Best Collaboration | "Beautiful People" (with Ed Sheeran) | Nominated | |
| 2020 | MTV Video Music Awards | Best R&B | "Eleven" (featuring Summer Walker) | Nominated | |
| 2020 | iHeartRadio Music Awards | Male Artist of the Year | Himself | Nominated | |
| 2020 | iHeartRadio Music Awards | R&B Artist of the Year | Himself | Nominated | |
| 2020 | iHeartRadio Music Awards | Best Collaboration | "Eastside" (with Benny Blanco and Halsey) | Nominated | |
| 2020 | iHeartRadio Music Awards | Best Lyric | "Beautiful People" (with Ed Sheeran) | Nominated | |
| 2020 | iHeartRadio Music Awards | R&B Song of the Year | "Talk" | Nominated | |
| 2020 | iHeartRadio Music Awards | R&B Album of the Year | Free Spirit | Won | |
| 2020 | NAACP Image Awards | Outstanding Male Artist | Himself | Nominated | |
| 2020 | NAACP Image Awards | Outstanding Song, Contemporary | "Talk" | Nominated | |
| 2020 | NAACP Image Awards | Outstanding Music Video | "Talk" | Nominated | |
| 2020 | Billboard Music Awards | Top Artist | Himself | Nominated | |
| 2020 | Billboard Music Awards | Top Male Artist | Himself | Nominated | |
| 2020 | Billboard Music Awards | Top Billboard 200 Artist | Himself | Nominated | |
| 2020 | Billboard Music Awards | Top Hot 100 Artist | Himself | Nominated | |
| 2020 | Billboard Music Awards | Top Radio Songs Artist | Himself | Nominated | |
| 2020 | Billboard Music Awards | Top R&B Tour Artist | Himself | Won | |
| 2020 | Billboard Music Awards | Top R&B Artist | Himself | Won | |
| 2020 | Billboard Music Awards | Top R&B Male Artist | Himself | Won | |
| 2020 | Billboard Music Awards | Top Radio Song | "Talk" | Nominated | |
| 2020 | Billboard Music Awards | Top R&B Song | "Talk" | Won | |
| 2020 | Billboard Music Awards | Top Billboard 200 Album | Free Spirit | Nominated | |
| 2020 | Billboard Music Awards | Top R&B Album | Free Spirit | Won | |
| 2020 | iHeartRadio Titanium Awards | 1 Billion Total Audience Spins on iHeartRadio Stations | "Talk" | Won | |
| 2020 | iHeartRadio Titanium Awards | 1 Billion Total Audience Spins on iHeartRadio Stations | "Better" | Won | |
| 2020 | Juno Awards | International Album of the Year | Free Spirit | Nominated | |
| 2021 | NAACP Image Awards | Outstanding Duo, Group or Collaboration (Contemporary) | "So Done" (with Alicia Keys) | Nominated | |
| 2022 | MTV Video Music Awards | Song of Summer | "Numb" (with Marshmello) | Nominated | |
| 2024 | Berlin Music Video Awards | Best VFX | "Satellite" | Nominated | |
