= Music Is the Weapon =

- Standard edition cover

Studio album by Major Lazer
- Released: October 23, 2020
- Length: 33:55
- Label: Mad Decent
- Producer: Diplo; Alvaro; Will Grands; Nitti Gritti; Boaz van de Beatz; Dee Mad; Tropkillaz; King Henry; Maximilian Jaeger; Jr Blender; Versano; Fred Again; Ape Drums; Kevin Chukwunye Akpewe; Kevin Bakker; Allimar Maduro; Beam; Almando Cresso; Nucleya

Major Lazer chronology
Soca Storm (2020)	Music Is the Weapon (2020)	Piano Republik (2023)

Singles from Music Is the Weapon
- 1. "Can't Take It from Me" Released: May 10, 2019; 2. "Que Calor" Released: September 11, 2019; 3. "Trigger" Released: October 24, 2019; 4. "Rave de Favela" Released: February 14, 2020; 5. "Lay Your Head on Me" Released: March 26, 2020; 6. "Oh My Gawd" Released: September 10, 2020; 7. "QueLoQue" Released: October 16, 2020

Alternative cover
- Deluxe edition cover

Singles from Music Is the Weapon (Reloaded)
- 1. "Pra te Machucar" Released: February 20, 2021; 2. "Diplomatico" Released: March 4, 2021; 3. "Titans" Released: March 26, 2021

Music Is the Weapon is the fourth studio album by American electronic band Major Lazer, released on October 23, 2020, via Mad Decent. It is Major Lazer's first studio album in five years since Peace Is the Mission (2015). First announced in 2015, many conflicting statements have been made about the album, with the latest reports being that it will be the final Major Lazer album. It was later announced in 2019 that the album would instead be titled Lazerism, but the name was later changed back to the original title. It is the first album to be released after Jillionaire left the group and was replaced by Ape Drums. A deluxe edition of the album titled Music Is the Weapon (Reloaded) was released on March 26, 2021.

== Background and singles ==
On April 27, 2015, Diplo revealed in an interview with Belgian radio station Studio Brussel that they have been working on a track with Belgian singer Selah Sue. He added that it might appear on their next album. Selah Sue herself confirmed this during an interview with Studio Brussels on May 4, 2015. In May 2015, Major Lazer revealed their fourth album would be called Music Is the Weapon.

A number of Major Lazer's singles released since the album's announcement have been reported to be on the album by journalists. "Cold Water" was released on July 22, 2016, featuring Justin Bieber and frequent Major Lazer collaborator MØ. The song received widespread airplay and made it a number one hit on the UK Singles Chart. Following the success of the song, leaked collaborations with singers Sia, Lorde and Bonnie McKee were announced, as well as teasing collaborations with former Fifth Harmony girl band member Camila Cabello and alternative R&B singer PartyNextDoor. In August 2016, the band's member Diplo teased on social media that he was working with Benny Blanco on a collab with American singer Ariana Grande, who was featured in the two short clips as well. The band also confirmed that they were collaborating with artists The Weeknd and Travis Scott.

On September 30, 2016, "Believer", was released as a collaboration with Showtek. In December 2016, it was announced that a song from the album, "Run Up" featuring Nicki Minaj and PartyNextDoor, would be released as a single. Several days later, on December 6, 2016, the promotional single "My Number" was released, in collaboration with the newly formed band Bad Royale. It features uncredited vocals from Toots & The Maytals. On June 1, 2017, "Know No Better" featuring Travis Scott, Camila Cabello and Quavo, was released as the fourth single from the album. Also in June 2017, Diplo stated in an interview with Billboard: "I shifted my goal to just make singles, because no one really buys our albums". Despite this, outlets such as NME continued to report through 2017 that the album was scheduled for a 2018 release. Reports surfaced in January 2018 that the album would be released the following March, but the album failed to materialize in 2018. In June 2018, the songs released until then were reportedly to be on the album, according to Forbes, but had not received official confirmation. In an interview with Complex in September 2018, Diplo said that he thought the album would be released in 2019 and that it would be the last Major Lazer album.

Due to the album's delay, the song "Can't Take It from Me", featuring Skip Marley, was released as the album's new lead single on May 10, 2019. The album's second single, "Que Calor", featuring J Balvin and El Alfa, was released on September 11, 2019. On March 18, 2020, Diplo announced that the album is complete. "Lay Your Head on Me", featuring Marcus Mumford of Mumford & Sons, was released as the album's fifth single on March 26, 2020. On the same day, Diplo revealed on BBC Radio 1 with Annie Mac that the album would be released in June 2020, and that it would feature appearances such as Sia and Nicki Minaj.

In a 2019 interview with Complex, Diplo revealed that the album was no longer titled Music Is the Weapon and would instead be titled Lazerism. However, in September 2020, Major Lazer tweeted that the album would once again be called Music Is the Weapon with a release date set for October 23, 2020. The tweet had an accompanying album artwork. The official track listing for the album was revealed on October 15, 2020. "QueLoQue" featuring Paloma Mami was released as the album's seventh single on October 16, 2020.

== Reception ==
The album's release was highly anticipated by a number of music and media outlets. Rolling Stone and WhatCulture listed it on its most anticipated albums of 2017 list. Complex named the album their 38th most-anticipated album of 2018. Idolator and Forbes also named it one of their most anticipated albums of 2018.

== Track listing ==
Music Is the Weapon track listing
No.	Title	Writer(s)	Producer(s)	Length
1.	"Hell and High Water" (featuring Alessia Cara)	Thomas Wesley Pentz; Philip Meckseper; Jasper Helderman; Bas van Daalen; Mickey Karbrl; Alessia Caracciolo	Diplo; Jr Blender; Alvaro; Will Grands	2:25
2.	"Sun Comes Up" (featuring Busy Signal and Joeboy)	Pentz; Kevin Chukwunye Akpewe; Reanno Gordon; Joseph Akinwale Akinfenwa-Donus	Diplo; Apkewe	2:39
3.	"Bam Bam" (featuring French Montana and Beam)	Pentz; Karim Kharbouch; Tyshane Thompson; Eric Alberto-Lopez; Kevin Bakker; Allimar Maduro	Diplo; Ape Drums; Bakker; Maduro	2:33
4.	"Tiny" (featuring Beam and Shenseea)	Pentz; Richard Mears; Helderman; van Daalen; Thompson; Marc Schulz; Almando Cresso; Chinsea Lee	Diplo; Beam; Alvaro; Grands; Al Cres	3:22
5.	"Oh My Gawd" (with Mr Eazi featuring Nicki Minaj and K4mo)	Pentz; Fred Gibson; Onika Maraj; Oluwatosin Ajibade; Dave Kelly; Anthony Kelly; K4mo	Diplo; Fred Again	3:00
6.	"Trigger" (with Khalid)	Pentz; Keckseper; Halderman; van Daalen; Andrew Wyatt; Khalid Robinson	Diplo; Jr Blender; Alvaro; Grands	2:51
7.	"Lay Your Head on Me" (featuring Marcus Mumford)	Pentz; Karen Marie Ørsted; Henry Allen; Marcus Mumford; Halderman; van Daalen	Diplo; Grands; King Henry; Maximilian Jaeger	3:19
8.	"Can't Take It from Me" (featuring Skip Marley)	Pentz; Skip Marley; Mears; Philip Constable; Helderman; Van Daalen	Diplo; Alvaro; Grands; Nitti Gritti	2:55
9.	"Rave de Favela" (with MC Lan and Anitta featuring Beam)	Pentz; Laudz; Thompson; Larissa Machado; José Pinheiro; Alberto-Lopez; Caio Cruz	Diplo; Tropkillaz; Ape Drums	2:34
10.	"QueLoQue" (featuring Paloma Mami)	Pentz; Helderman; Van Daalen; Anthony Clemons Jr.; Paloma Astorga; Andrea Mangimarchi; MLKMN	Diplo; Alvaro; Grands	2:45
11.	"Jadi Buti" (with Nucleya featuring Rashmeet Kaur)	Pentz; Rashmeet Kaur; Raftaar; Alberto-Lopez	Diplo; Ape Drums; Nucleya	2:43
12.	"Que Calor" (featuring J Balvin and El Alfa)	Pentz; Alejandro Ramírez; Andre da Silva; Antonio Fernandez; Emmanuel Batista; Jose de Godoy; Pinheiro; José Balvín; Sonia Bazanta; Thompson; Wissem Larfaoui	Dee Mad; Diplo; Tropkillaz	2:49
Total length:				33:55

Music Is the Weapon (Reloaded) track listing
No.	Title	Writer(s)	Producer(s)	Length
1.	"Titans" (featuring Sia and Labrinth)	Boaz van de Beatz; Meckseper; Sia Furler; Pentz; Timothy McKenzie; Yonatan Goldstein	Diplo	3:19
2.	"Diplomatico" (featuring Guaynaa)	Alberto-Lopez; Felva; Jean Carlos Santiago Pérez; Pentz	Diplo	2:24
3.	"Que Calor" (featuring J Balvin and El Alfa)	Pentz; Ramírez; da Silva; Fernandez; Batista; de Godoy; Pinheiro; Balvín; Bazanta; Thompson; Larfaoui	Dee Mad; Diplo; Tropkillaz	2:49
4.	"C'est cuit" (featuring Aya Nakamura and Swae Lee)	Aya Danioko; Guy Ziré; Khalif Malik ibn Shaman Brown; Pentz; Larfaoui	Dee Mad; Diplo	2:36
5.	"Hell and High Water" (featuring Alessia Cara)	Pentz; Meckseper; Helderman; van Daalen; Karbrl; Caracciolo	Diplo; Jr Blender; Alvaro; Grands	2:25
6.	"Pra te Machucar" (with Ludmilla featuring ÀTTØØXXÁ and Suku Ward)	Andre Grey; Ludmila Oliveira da Silva; Osmar Gomes Torres; Rafa Dias; Raoni Torres Gome; Pentz; Wallace Carvalho dos Santos Ferreira		2:37
7.	"QueLoQue" (featuring Paloma Mami)	Pentz; Helderman; van Daalen; Clemons Jr.; Astorga; Mangimarchi; MLKMN	Diplo; Alvaro; Grands	2:45
8.	"Sun Comes Up" (featuring Busy Signal and Joeboy)	Pentz; Akpewe; Gordon; Akinfenwa-Donus	Diplo; Apkewe	2:39
9.	"Bam Bam" (featuring French Montana and Beam)	Pentz; Kharbouch; Thompson; Alberto-Lopez; Bakker; Maduro	Diplo; Ape Drums; Bakker; Maduro	2:33
10.	"Tiny" (featuring Beam and Shenseea)	Pentz; Mears; Helderman; van Daalen; Thompson; Schulz; Cresso; Lee	Diplo; Beam; Alvaro; Grands; Cresso	3:22
11.	"Oh My Gawd" (with Mr Eazi featuring Nicki Minaj and K4mo)	Pentz; Gibson; Maraj; Ajibade; D. Kelly; A. Kelly; K4mo	Diplo; Fred Again	3:00
12.	"Hands Up" (featuring Moonchild Sanelly and Morena Leraba)	van Daalen; Ian Alvarez; Ivano Leonard Ilayes Miharie; Alvaro; Morena Leraba; Sanelisiwe Twisha; Pentz	Alvaro; Grands; Diplo; Frnkie	3:14
13.	"Trigger" (with Khalid)	Pentz; Keckseper; Halderman; van Daalen; Wyatt; Robinson	Diplo; Jr Blender; Alvaro; Grands	2:51
14.	"Lay Your Head on Me" (featuring Marcus Mumford)	Pentz; Ørsted; Allen; Mumford; Halderman; van Daalen	Diplo; Grands; King Henry; Jaeger	3:19
15.	"Can't Take It from Me" (featuring Skip Marley)	Pentz; Marley; Mears; Constable; Helderman; van Daalen	Diplo; Alvaro; Grands; Nitti Gritti	2:55
16.	"Rave de Favela" (with MC Lan and Anitta featuring Beam)	Pentz; Laudz; Thompson; Machado; Pinheiro; Alberto-Lopez; Cruz	Diplo; Tropkillaz; Ape Drums	2:34
17.	"Jadi Buti" (with Nucleya featuring Rashmeet Kaur)	Pentz; Kaur; Raftaar; Alberto-Lopez	Diplo; Ape Drums; Nucleya	2:43

== Personnel ==
Major Lazer

- Diplo – composer, producer, executive producer (1–12)
- Walshy Fire – producer (1–12)
- Ape Drums – producer (1–12)

== Charts ==
Chart performance for Music Is the Weapon
Chart (2020–2021)	Peak position
French Albums (SNEP)	60
Spanish Albums (Promusicae)	98
US Top Dance Albums (Billboard)	5
