= Alexander Grossmann (journalist) =

Zionist activist

Alexander Grossman (born Grossmann, Sándor 3 March 1909 – 29 October 2003) was a Zionist activist and, during the German occupation, a Hungarian resistance hero. After emigrating/immigrating in 1949 he spent a period as a member of the Kibbutz Ma'abarot. In the early 1950s he emigrated/immigrated again, and became a Swiss journalist and author.

== Life ==
=== Provenance and early years ===
Sándor Grossmann was born in Pusztaszomolló on the edge of the rapidly expanding industrial city of Miskolc in north-east Hungary. Leopold and Serena Schlesinger, his parents, were members of the city's German speaking community, and deeply religious adherents of the Orthodox faith. Leopold Schlesinger died in 1915 and his widow moved the family into Miskolc where Sándor attended the Jewish middle school. Early on he also became a co-founder of the local HeHalutz (Jewish "Young Pioneer") group.

=== Growing up fast ===
As he grew up Grossmann became aware of a relentless growth in antisemitism on the streets and in the institutions of the recently launched Hungarian state. He became involved in the Kadimah association, and in 1925 teamed up with some friends to form the "Blue-White" movement which in 1927 would merge into the Hashomer Hatzair Socialist-Zionist youth movement, of which he thereby became one of the first members in Hungary. Between 1928 and 1938, and again between 1945 and 1949, he was a contributing editor on the German-language literary journal, "Der Weg" ("The Path"). Meanwhile, he did not neglect his education, attending the "Volkswirtschaftsuniversität" in Budapest. It is not clear whether it was his political activism or simply his Jewishness that led to his exclusion before he had the opportunity to complete his studies, however. On leaving Budapest he returned to Miskolc. The old Austria-Hungarian Empire had been famously multi-ethnic, and at this time the city still had the second largest Jewish population in Hungary. A congenital networker, Grossmann became more intensively involved in Zionist activism than ever.

=== Ilona ===
In 1934 Grossmann married his first wife, Ilona Krausz. Their only child, Stephan, was born in 1940. After the German invasion in March 1944 mother and son were moved to the Miskolc ghetto. They were later transported, with most of Grossmann's other relatives, to the Auschwitz death camp, and murdered.

=== Budapest ===
Helped by a friend who was a police officer, when the ghetto was set up at Miskolc during the early summer of 1944, Grossmann managed to avoid the round-up by escaping to Budapest. While on a mission he was captured by the Gestapo, who suspected that he had been involved in helping Jews escape from (occupied) Hungary to Romania. He spent three months in Gestapo detention. Through the intervention of National Bank President Saranyai he was transported not to Auschwitz but to the internment camp at Kistarcsa. On 29 September 1944 he was released. He made his way to the Glass House, a redeployed glass factory in Budapest which had been designated a branch of the Swiss embassy, (Note: The Swiss government was representing the diplomatic interests internationally of at least ten different belligerent powers that had broken off diplomatic relations between themselves. The Swiss embassy in Budapest therefore had very good reasons for needing more space.) and which was therefore afforded diplomatic protection through the heroic efforts (and devious legalistic inventiveness) of the Swiss vice-consul, Carl Lutz. At one point, during the closing part of 1944, the Glass House served as a refuge for as many as 3,000 Jews, who would otherwise have faced deportation and murder. The building also became a centre for the organisation of a wider rescue programme which saved the lives of many times that number of those whom the National Socialists wished to destroy. He quickly emerged in a leading role, joining the "Palestine Committee" first as a delegate and then, in October 1944, becoming its chairman. At the same time he became a member of the directorate of the Emigration Department of the Swiss Diplomat Mission in Budapest (Note: "Mitglied des Direktoriums der Auswanderungsabteilung der Schweizerischen Gesandtschaft in Budapest".) which meant working very closely with Vice-consul Carl Lutz himself. From October 1944 he headed up the rescue programme which involved issuing and distributing the diplomatic letters of protection under the authorization of the vice-consul. Under exceptionally tough conditions this meant providing care and support for perhaps 40,000 Jewish refugees who were distributed around Budapest in maybe 50 "safe houses" which enjoyed Swiss diplomatic protection. Grossmann during this period had the status of a fully authorized Swiss diplomat and was accordingly able to move freely around the city. This freedom enabled him to undertake important administrative and organisational work on behalf of residual Jewish organisations. Back at the Glass House, when doubts were expressed that admitting yet more of the Jewish persecutees gathered outside might endanger the lives of the people already inside, Grossmann made the (subsequently much quoted) assertion, "For the sake of one hundred thousand Jews it is worthwhile to risk our own lives", and personally opened the gates of the complex.

Budapest was liberated in January and February 1945. Grossmann became a member of the American Jewish Joint Distribution Committee and a co-chairman of the Hungarian Zionist Association. He became a director of the Budapest "Eretz-Israel" office. He also engaged with the reintegration of large numbers of returning refugees through the creation of 31 agricultural co-operatives and 50 commercial co-operatives. Sadly, however, the defeat of National Socialism had not put an end to race-based discrimination. The 1940s were a decade of on-going ethnic cleansing across much of central Europe. The problem now was not that Grossmann was Jewish, but that he was a mother-tongue German speaker. During 1949 he left Hungary.

=== Moving on and settling down ===
Between 1949 and 1951 Grossmann undertook lengthy stays in Paris and in the newly launched state of Israel. He became a member of the Kibbutz Ma'abarot till 1951. That was the year during which he settled in Geneva, where he would live for the next fifty-two years. On 24 July 1951 he married his second wife, fellow-Hungarian Vera Halasz. Back in Budapest during 1944 Halasz had been released back to her parents' home three days after being rounded up by a gang of policemen and quislings. Like unnumbered thousands of others, she had been released because she was able to show her captors a Swiss diplomatic letter of protection.

=== Swiss writer ===
Grossmann became editorial director of the Hungarian language Zionist magazine "Múlt és Jövo". He also served between 1951 and 1962 as editorial director of "Die Zukunft". Grossmann wrote several books, the most important of which was a resolute endorsement of his former mentor and now firm friend, Carl Lutz. The industrial-scale life-saving achievements of Carl Lutz were not immediately acknowledged by the Swiss authorities who in 1945, fearful of endangering the nation's much prized neutrality, merely reprimanded him for having exceeded his authority during his posting to Budapest. Carl Lutz would never achieve the widespread credit accorded to his Swedish colleague in Budapest, Raoul Wallenberg (possibly because, unlike Wallenburg, he did not "disappear"), but by the 1980s the scale of Lutz's wartime achievement, already recognised and celebrated in Israel, was beginning to become more widely known both in Switzerland and further afield. Much of the credit for that must go to Alexander Grossmann and his book "Nur das Gewissen. Carl Lutz und seine Budapester Aktion", published in Switzerland in 1986 (in German), and translated into Hungarian in 2003.
