= Peter Zürcher =

Swiss businessman

Peter Zürcher (1914–1975) was a Swiss businessman who worked in the Department of the Foreign Interests at the Swiss Embassy in Budapest. He was known for rescuing tens of thousands of Jews during the Holocaust.

== Early life ==
Dr. Peter Zürcher was born in 1914 in Zurich, Switzerland. He moved to Hungary in his childhood, and in 1940 he became the owner of a business company in Budapest. In 1944, he was employed by Carl Lutz, Switzerland's Vice-Consul (a future Righteous Among the Nations honoree), in the Department of the Foreign Interests at the Swiss Embassy in Budapest.

== Activity during WWII ==
Both Lutz and Zürcher acted together in order to save Jews, and under the cover of the Swiss Embassy distributed thousands of fake protective passes in the Death March. On Christmas day 1944, the conditions worsened and Lutz couldn't leave his house, so from that day on, Zürcher took his place and served as a temporary head of the department. He continued to help Jews by providing fake documents and IDs that helped them to escape from the evacuations to the concentration and extermination camps from the ghetto. He succeeded in preventing the SS and the gangs of the Arrow Cross (Hungarian pro-Nazi party) from massacring approximately 70,000 inhabitants from the Ghetto of Pest by threatening to bring the SS commandant before a court if he would harm his Jewish workers. On January 8, 1945, Zürcher discovered the Arrow Cross party had planned an evacuation of a major community of Jews who were living in the Swiss protective houses in the International Ghetto, after which they would probably be murdered or transferred. He contacted the leader of the Arrow Cross, Gábor Vajna, and demanded to end the Arrow Cross's attacks on the protective houses of the Swiss Embassy. The planned evacuation was canceled. Zürcher also saved his secretary, Maria Kormos, and risked his life for her. According to her testimony, the Arrow Cross came on October 15, 1944, and from the 20th of that month she could no longer leave her room. She asked Zürcher for help, and he advised her to offer the housekeeper a large sum, but that didn't work. He sent four men dressed as Arrow Cross soldiers to take her. After persuading the housekeeper, they released Kormos and took her to Zürcher, who waited for her at the Swiss Legation in the American Embassy building. Knowing he couldn't hide her there, Zürcher let her stay at his house for six weeks, until he was able to give her fake documents and find her a pension to live in until the end of the war.

== Honors ==
- Zürcher died in 1975, and on October 22, 1998, was recognized as a Righteous Among the Nations by Yad Vashem. He was honored with the Yad Vashem medal "Righteous Among the Nations" at a ceremony at the Amtshaus in Bern, Switzerland on September 6, 1999.

== See also ==
- Carl Lutz
- The Holocaust in Hungary
