= Walking with the Enemy =

2013 film by Mark Schmidt

- Teaser poster
- Directed by: Mark Schmidt
- Screenplay by: Kenny Golde
- Story by: Mark Schmidt
- Produced by: Mark Schmidt; Randy Williams; Christopher Williams; D. Scott Trawick; Brian Schmidt
- Starring: Jonas Armstrong; Hannah Tointon; Ben Kingsley
- Cinematography: Dean Cundey
- Edited by: Richard Nord
- Music by: Tim Williams
- Production companies: Liberty Studios, Inc.
- Distributed by: Liberty Studios, Inc.
- Release date: April 25, 2014
- Running time: 123 minutes
- Country: United States
- Language: English
- Box office: $1.1 million

Walking with the Enemy is a 2014 American action drama film directed by Mark Schmidt, and scripted by Kenny Golde and Mark Schmidt. The film stars Jonas Armstrong, Ben Kingsley, Simon Kunz, Hannah Tointon, Simon Dutton, Burn Gorman, and Charles Hubbell. It is inspired by the true story of Pinchas Tibor Rosenbaum.

Set in Budapest and nearby villages, it depicts the German occupation of Hungary during the final months of the Second World War. The story is about a young Hungarian-Jewish man, Elek Cohen (played by Jonas Armstrong), who dons an SS uniform to pose as an officer to find out the fate of his family and to rescue fellow Jews from the Holocaust.

== Plot ==
On the eve of the German occupation of Hungary in 1944, as Nazi presence and anti-Semitic laws increase in Budapest, Jewish radio repair shop owner József sends home the two young men who work for him, Elek Cohen and Ferenc Jacobson. They obtain forged baptismal certificates from a Catholic priest and urge their families to use them to escape Hungary when they themselves are forced to join the Hungarian labour service, in which Jewish men are brutally treated, shot if they cannot keep up or are injured while doing work.

Meanwhile, Carl Lutz runs the Swiss diplomatic office at the Glass House in Budapest. Supposedly, anyone with a Swiss passport can safely leave Hungary for Switzerland. He was given permission to issue 8,000 passes to individual Jews, but he interpreted this to mean families, and printed and numbered the passes accordingly.

When Elek and Ferenc escape from the Labour Service, they find their way back home and discover their families have been sent away. Elek's home has been ransacked, and he finds the baptismal certificates taped to the back of a family photo that he saves. Meanwhile, Horthy secretly negotiates with Stalin for an armistice with the Allies, but the Nazis learn of this, abduct his son, storm the Buda Castle and he is overthrown, later to be imprisoned in Germany. In his place, the Hungarian fascist Arrow Cross Party assumes power, led by Ferenc Szálasi, who collaborate with the Nazis in rounding up Jews.

On instinct, Elek and Ferenc start to do whatever they can to save Jewish families and eventually begin to work with Lutz. Before the Nazis focused on eliminating the Jews from Hungary, Elek met a Jewish girl named Hannah. One evening some time later, Nazi officers follow her to where many Jews, including Elek, are hiding. Elek kills them before they can rape Hannah. Later Elek, who speaks fluent German, and Ferenc dig up the bodies of the Nazi officers and take their uniforms. For months their fearless impersonation of SS officers allows them to pretend to round up Jews for transport while saving thousands by redirecting them to safe houses. Once there, in care of the Swiss (and in at least one case a convent), the Jews begin their journey to freedom.

The story ends at the Siege of Budapest and the Russian army defeat the occupying Nazis. Elek is shot by an SS lieutenant when his son leaves a group of captured Jews to hug him and calls him by name. The lieutenant is killed in turn by the German commander tired of him disobeying orders.

As an epitaph the story jumps thirteen years, to 1958. Elek has emigrated to New York City and is shown at the wedding of his adopted son.

Postscript

This movie was inspired by true events and the movie postscripts read: "This film was inspired by the courage of Pinchas Rosenbaum whose passports and rescue missions saved thousands of lives. His family was murdered in Auschwitz along with 500,000 Hungarian Jews. SS Lt. Colonel Otto Skorzeny surrendered to the US Army. After trials and reprieves, he died in 1975. Dieter Wisliceny was hanged in 1948 for war crimes. Ferenc Szalasi was hanged in 1946 for war crimes and high treason. Arrow Cross Captain Kovarcz was hanged in 1946 for war crimes. Adolf Eichmann escaped to Argentina and was later captured by Israeli agents. He was convicted for crimes against humanity and hanged in 1962. Regent Horthy and his son were held in German imprisonments until after the war. They never returned to Hungary due to the Soviet occupation and died in Portugal in 1957 and 1993. Carl Lutz established the Swiss Legion (The Glass House) and is honored for the lives he saved. He died in 1975. After the war, Mr. Rosenbaum seldom spoke of his heroic deeds. He died in 1980 and his wife died in 2010. They are survived by three children. In 2005, the memorial Shoes on the Danube Bank was dedicated in Budapest to honor the victims murdered during the Nazi and Arrow Cross terror."

== Cast ==
- Jonas Armstrong as Elek Cohen
- Ben Kingsley as Regent Horthy
- Hannah Tointon as Hannah Schoen
- Simon Kunz as József Greenberg
- Simon Dutton as Miklós Schoen
- Burn Gorman as Colonel Skorzeny
- Shane Taylor as Miklós Horthy, Jr.
- William Hope as Carl Lutz
- Flora Spencer-Longhurst as Rachel Schoen
- Simon Hepworth as President Szálasi
- Andrew Brooke as Capt. Varga
- Charles De'Ath as Lt. Krieger
- Mark Wells as Ferenc Jacobson
- Charles Hubbell as Adolf Eichmann
- Mark Wingett as Sorenzi
- Patrick Toomey as Wisliceny
- Robert Jezek as János Balacz
- Richard Albrecht as Rabbi Cohen
- David Leon as Lajos
- Jade Moulla as Sofi Cohen
- Karl Backus as Colonel Klein

== Reception ==
Two trailers were released on April 22, 2014. The film received mixed reviews, Rotten Tomatoes gives the film a rating of 46% with an average rating of 5.30/10 based on reviews from 37 critics.
