= Alexander Grossmann =

Alexander Grossmann may refer to:

- Alexander Grossmann (French scholar), French-American physicist of Croatian origin
- Alexander Grossmann (journalist), Zionist activist and Hungarian resistance hero, later a Swiss journalist and author
- Alexander Grossmann (German scholar), German physicist and publisher
