= Lay Your Head on Me =

Single by Major Lazer featuring Marcus Mumford

from the album Music Is the Weapon
- Released: March 26, 2020
- Length: 3:19
- Label: Mad Decent
- Songwriter(s): Henry Agincourt Allen; Karen Marie Aagaard Ørsted Andersen; Jasper Helderman; Marcus Mumford; Thomas Pentz; Bas van Daalen
- Producer(s): Alvaro; Diplo; King Henry; Will Grands

Major Lazer singles chronology
"Rave de Favela" (2020)	"Lay Your Head on Me" (2020)	"Oh My Gawd" (2020)

Marcus Mumford singles chronology
"You'll Never Walk Alone" (2020)	"Lay Your Head on Me" (2020)	"Cannibal" (2022)

"Lay Your Head on Me" is a song by American music project Major Lazer, featuring vocals from British musician and lead singer of the band Mumford & Sons, Marcus Mumford. It was released as the fifth single from Major Lazer's fourth studio album, Music Is the Weapon, on March 26, 2020. The song was written by Henry Agincourt Allen, Karen Marie Aagaard Ørsted Andersen, Jasper Helderman, Mumford, Thomas Pentz and Bas van Daalen.

== Background ==
According to a press release, the collaboration came about after Marcus Mumford and Diplo became friends and started experimenting in the studio together. Danish pop star MØ, who has previously worked with Major Lazer on "Lean On", "Lost" and "Cold Water", also co-wrote the song.

== Chart performance ==
The single became Major Lazer's third number one, as well as Mumford's first, to reach Billboard’s Dance/Mix Show Airplay chart in its August 22, 2020 issue.

== Charts ==
=== Weekly charts ===
Chart (2020)	Peak position
Belgium (Ultratop 50 Flanders)	43
Belgium (Ultratop 50 Wallonia)	15
Czech Republic (Rádio – Top 100)	94
Iceland (Tónlistinn)	33
Mexico Airplay (Billboard)	15
Slovakia (Rádio Top 100)	98
Netherlands (Dutch Top 40)	29
US Hot Dance/Electronic Songs (Billboard)	11
US Rock Airplay (Billboard)	7
US Hot Rock & Alternative Songs (Billboard)	26

=== Year-end charts ===
Chart (2020)	Position
Belgium (Ultratop Wallonia)	69
US Rock Airplay (Billboard)	41
US Hot Dance/Electronic Songs (Billboard)	23

== Release history ==
Region	Date	Format	Label
Various	March 26, 2020	Digital download; streaming	Mad Decent

== See also ==
- List of Billboard number-one dance songs of 2020
