= Trigger (song) =

Single by Major Lazer and Khalid

from the album Death Stranding: Timefall and Music Is the Weapon
- Released: October 24, 2019
- Length: 2:51
- Label: Third Pardee; RCA
- Songwriters: Andrew Wyatt; Bas van Daalen; Jasper Helderman; Khalid Robinson; Philip Meckseper; Thomas Pentz
- Producers: Alvaro; Will Grands; Diplo; Jr Blender

Major Lazer singles chronology
"Que Calor" (2019)	"Trigger" (2019)	"Evapora" (2019)

Khalid singles chronology
"Hurts 2B Human" (2019)	"Trigger" (2019)	"Up All Night" (2019)

Music video
- "Trigger" on YouTube

"Trigger" is a song by American band Major Lazer and American singer-songwriter Khalid. It was released on October 24, 2019, through Third Pardee and RCA Records as the fourth single of the soundtrack Death Stranding: Timefall and the third single from Major Lazer's fourth studio album Music Is the Weapon. The song is the latest single of the soundtrack. The song was firstly announced on October 1, 2019, at the same time as the announcement of the track listing of the game soundtrack.

== Critical reception ==
Ryan Reed of Rolling Stone noted that the two artists used "a gunshot as a breakup metaphor on their reflective song". He described it as "a brief track", with two verses, two choruses, which "builds to a wordless hook of trendy, pitch-shifted vocals and a stuttering dance beat". Kat Bein of Billboard deemed the song "a ballad beat with muted dancehall influence". Phil Scilippa of EDM.com wrote that "Trigger" looks like "a low key love song, with the classic [Major Lazer's] dancehall-inspired themes, sprinkled in throughout a more R&B-centric production. According to him, the track is "a lot more chilled-out than the amped-up vibe of a game like Death Stranding", justified by when "Khalid lays down the vocals just as well as ever, tying together the warm atmosphere of the track". Chris Stack of Dancing Astronaut noted the presence of "lush synths for Khalid’s crooning vocals to rest upon and flourish", accompanied by "soft chords [which] caress the verse and lead into another keynote from Major Lazer". According to him, the combination of wind instruments and vocal melody hook the listener after Khalid succeeds in seducing them with his emotive incandescence". Concerning the lyrics, he affirmed that they "arrive as reflective poetry" and "run deep, alluding to a gunshot as a metaphor for a breakup". Matthew Meadow of Your EDM wrote that the track "features a soft, soothing melody that sets itself apart from the usual raucous tone of Major Lazer’s typical fare". Writing for Complex, Joe Price called the track "an arena-ready production with Khalid's forlorn vocals", "both hopeful and decidely [sic] melancholy" like the previous songs of the soundtrack, and which "offers an indication of the solemn mood Death Stranding strives for". Concerning the composition, he wrote that the song "pushes its futuristic synthpop into a club setting by the time the chorus hits". Mitch Findlay of HowNewHipHop said, "As the up-tempo drums kick in, and questions as to what this has to do with Death Stranding become more and more prevalent, Khalid dulls the cognitive dissonance with his dulcet tones". Clara C. of French radio NRJ described the rhythm of the song as "relatively slow". She noted that the song seaks about loneliness and abandonment by the singer, according to his vocals. Spanish radio Planeta FM felt the song endowed with "rather slow beats, a soft sound that is the perfect accompaniment to its lyrical content". They noted the lyrics "worthy of a ballad" which are "about the separation of a great love".

== Credits and personnel ==
Credits adapted from Tidal.

- Alvaro – production, composition, lyrics
- Bas van Daalen – production, composition, lyrics
- Diplo – production, composition, lyrics
- Jr Blender – production, composition, lyrics
- Khalid – composition, lyrics
- Andrew Wyatt – composition, lyrics
- Michael Romero – assistant engineer
- Dale Becker – master engineering
- Denis Kosiak – mix engineering, record engineering

== Charts ==
Chart performance for "Trigger"
Chart (2019)	Peak position
Australia (ARIA)	46
Belgium (Ultratip Bubbling Under Wallonia)	37
Canada Hot 100 (Billboard)	75
Czech Republic Singles Digital (ČNS IFPI)	95
Greece International Digital (IFPI Greece)	58
Ireland (IRMA)	55
Lithuania (AGATA)	50
New Zealand Hot Singles (RMNZ)	11
Slovakia Singles Digital (ČNS IFPI)	62
Sweden (Sverigetopplistan)	57
Switzerland (Schweizer Hitparade)	96
UK Singles (Official Charts)	95

== Certifications ==
Region	Certification	Certified units/sales
Brazil (Pro-Música Brasil)	Gold	20,000^{‡}
New Zealand (RMNZ)	Gold	15,000^{‡}
^{‡} Sales+streaming figures based on certification alone.
