= Blk Jks =

South African rock band

- Origin: Johannesburg, South Africa
- Genres: Alternative rock Experimental rock Progressive rock
- Years active: 2000 – present
- Label: Secretly Canadian
- Members: Mpumelelo Mcata (guitar); Molefi Makananise (bass); Tshepang Ramoba (drums)
- Past members: Lindani Buthelezi (vocals & guitar)

Blk Jks, stylized BLK JKS (disemvowelment of Black Jacks), are a South African rock band from Johannesburg, formed in 2000.

== History ==
=== 2000–2007: Formation and early years ===
Childhood friends Mpumelelo Mcata and Lindani Buthelezi grew up together in Spruitview, East Rand, where they founded the Blk Jks in 2000. After varying lineups, they were joined by Molefi Makananise (bass) and Tshepang Ramoba (drums) from Soweto and the four played their first gig in Grahamstown in 2005. A year later, they came second in the run-up to represent South Africa at the Global Battle of the Bands competition. After the release of a self-titled EP with five songs, the band began recording songs at SABC studio for an LP titled After Robots. Due to lack of funds and without a record label, these unedited masters were not completed. Instead, in 2007 the Blk Jks released a collector's 10-inch of Lakeside and a series of lo-fi records titled Kilani Sessions.

=== 2008–2010: Break through and international success ===
Notwithstanding limited recognition in South Africa, Blk Jks gained international acclaim. American DJ Diplo noticed them while on tour in South Africa and offered to sign the band to his Mad Decent label. While the deal was never closed, Diplo still brought them over to New York City. So, early in 2008 Blk Jks toured the United States and in March appeared on the cover of Fader Magazine. Later that year, they also toured Europe and eventually signed with U.S. indie label Secretly Canadian. Their EP Mystery was recorded at New York's famous Electric Lady Studios. It was first released independently in 2008 and later reissued with Secretly Canadian in 2009. Another tour to the United States included a gig at the South by Southwest festival in Austin. Being signed to a label also allowed the Blk Jks to finally finish their debut album. Produced by Secret Machines' Brandon Curtis, After Robots was released with Secretly Canadian on 8 September 2009. Rolling Stone magazine dubbed the Blk Jks 'Africa's best new band' and rated After Robots three-and-a-half out of five stars; the review states "When [the Blk Jks] do it their way, they sound like nothing else". Likewise, a review on Pitchfork appreciated After Robots as "a hugely ambitious album, with swooping forays into kwaito, ska, reggae, ambience, jazz, prog, and furor." Nonetheless, the review's author complained the Blk Jks would not live up to the hype created by comparisons calling them the "African TV on the Radio" and he only gave the album a 6.2 rating. Foo Fighter frontman Dave Grohl, on the other hand, declared After Robots his favorite album of 2009.

Their international reputation also gained the band more attention nationally. The Mail & Guardian listed the Blk Jks in their yearly feature of eminent 200 Young South Africans in 2009 and 2010. The band was nominated for best album and best English alternative album at the 2010 South African Music Awards, taking home the latter. Blk Jks released their EP Zol! just two days before performing at the 2010 FIFA World Cup Kick-off concert in Soweto's Orlando Stadium on 10 June 2010. The band's track "Lakeside", taken from After Robots, also featured on the soundtrack EA Sports' FIFA 10 video game.

=== 2011–present: side projects, lineup changes and collaborations ===
After their international tours, the Blk Jks kept playing gigs in South Africa. Lindani Buthelezi and the other band members eventually estranged. Buthelezi formed God Sons and Daughter in 2012 and left the Blk Jks shortly after. Mcata and Ramoba started a DJ project called Blk Jks Soundsystem together, as well as, the band Motèl Mari with João Orrechia. Mcata directed 'Black President,' a documentary film about Zimbabwean artist Kudzanai Chiurai. Ramoba started producing for singer Moonchild Sanelly. The three remaining band members nevertheless kept working together. In 2014, they cast a singer to open for the Foo Fighters on their tour in South Africa and terminated their contract with Secretly Canadian. Two new members also joined the group: trumpeter Tebogo Seitei and Hlubi Vakalisa on saxophone and keyboards.

Together with the South African ensemble The Brother Moves On, Blk Jks collaborated in a project called 'Blk Brother' in 2015, something they have done in the past with Malian musician Vieux Farka Touré and his band. For the Afropunk Festival Johannesburg 2017, they collaborated with singer Thandiswa Mazwai as 'King Tha' vs. Blk Jks. As a tribute to the legendary South African jazz musician Hugh Masekela, who died in January 2018, the Blk Jks covered "The Boy's Doin' It" together with Masekela's son Selema 'Sal' Masekela of Alekesam and nephew Selema. It was the band's first release in nine years. In 2019, the Blk Jks announced their second album with the release of their single "Harare" (feat. Morena Leraba).

== Discography ==
=== Albums ===
- 2009: After Robots (Secretly Canadian)
- 2021 Abantu / Before Humans

=== EPs ===
- 2006: BLK JKS (independent)
- 2009: Mystery (Secretly Canadian)
- 2010: Zol! (Secretly Canadian)

=== Singles ===
- 2018: (with Alekesam, Hugh Masekela ft. Selema) The Boy's Doin' It (Permanent Record)
- 2019: (feat. Morena Leraba) Harare
