= After Robots =

Studio album by Blk Jks
- Released: September 8, 2009
- Studios: Russian Recording, Bloomington, Indiana
- Genre: Indie rock
- Length: 46:09
- Label: Secretly Canadian
- Producer: Brandon Curtis

Blk Jks chronology
Mystery (2009)	After Robots (2009)	Zol! (2010)

After Robots is the first full-length album by the South African indie rock band BLK JKS. It was released on September 8, 2009 on the Secretly Canadian label.

== Critical reception ==
Professional ratings
Aggregate scores
Source	Rating
Metacritic	75/100
Review scores
Source	Rating
AllMusic	3.5/5 stars
The A.V. Club	B+
Clash	7/10
Consequence of Sound	C+
Drowned in Sound	8/10
The Guardian	4/5 stars
MusicOMH	3.5/5 stars
Paste	4.2/10
Pitchfork	6.2/10

According to Metacritic, based on 21 critic reviews, After Robots has a score of 75 out of 100, indicating "generally favorable reviews". For example, Gideon Brody of Drowned in Sound gave it a rating of 8 out of 10 and concluded, "When it's at its best, After Robots harbours a brave sense of adventurism, a fearless experimentalism."

== Track listing ==
No.	Title	Length
1.	"Molalatladi"	3:45
2.	"Banna Ba Modimo"	5:10
3.	"Standby"	4:52
4.	"Lakeside"	4:07
5.	"Taxidermy"	3:48
6.	"Kwa Nqingetje"	7:58
7.	"Skeleton"	4:39
8.	"Cursor"	5:18
9.	"Tselane"	6:32

== Personnel ==
- Lindani Buthelezi – guitar, vocals
- Molefi Makananise – bass guitar, vocals
- Mpumi Mcata – rhythm guitar, lead vocals
- Tshepang Ramoba – drums, vocals
- Hypnotic Brass Ensemble – brass
- Mike Kapinus – trumpet
- Mike Pallman – saxophone
- Mike Bridavsky – engineering
- Brandon Curtis – mixing, production
- Andrew Dosunmu – photography
- Joe Lambert – mastering
- Mike Notaro – engineering
- Geoff Sanoff – mixing
