= Maximilian Jaeger =

Swiss politician (1884–1959)

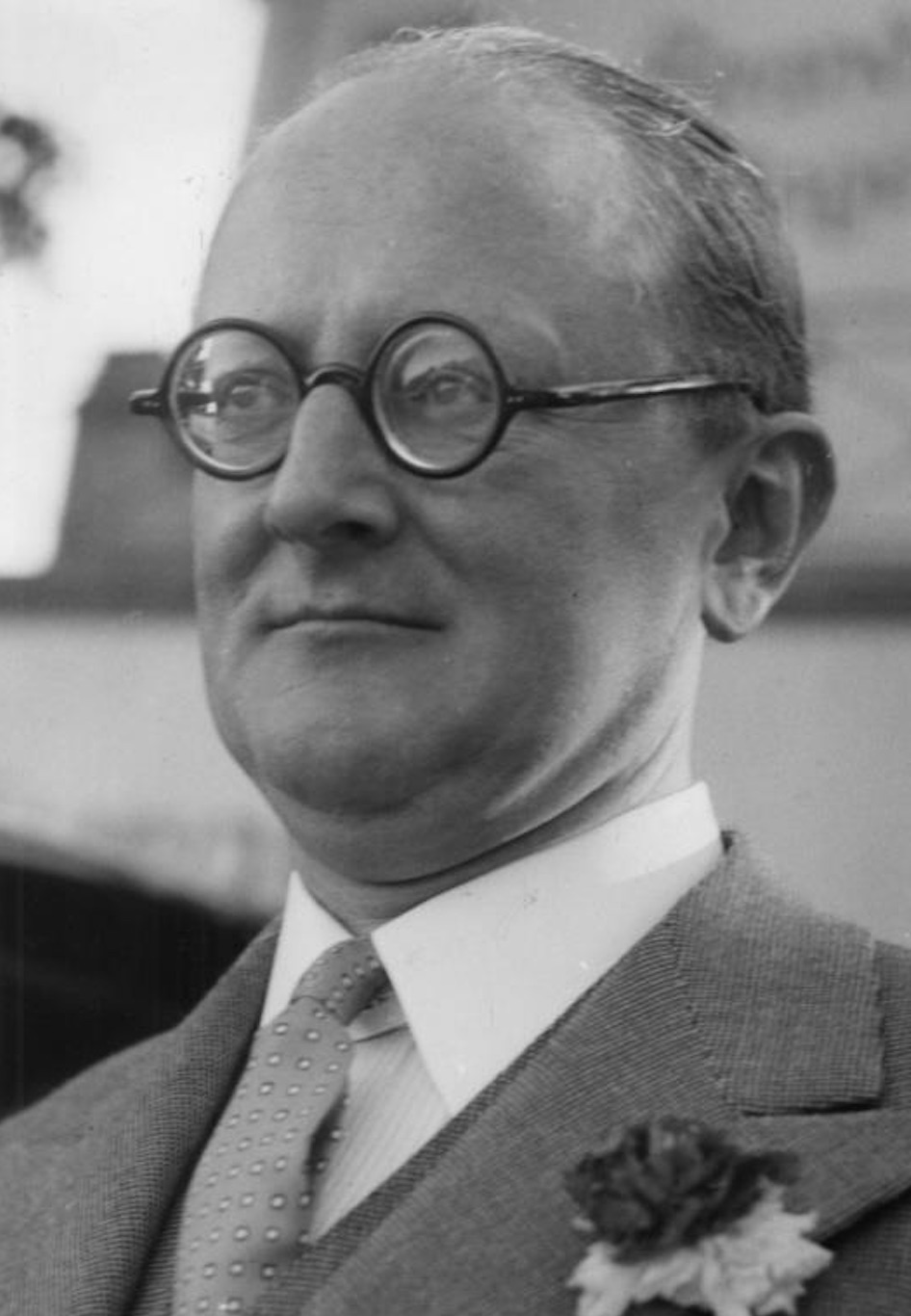
Jaeger circa 1937

Maximilian Jaeger (1884–1959) was a Swiss Minister in Budapest from 1925 to 1944. Between 1925 and 1938 he was headquartered in Vienna (with accreditation in Hungary) and from 1938 until 1944 Swiss Minister in Budapest.

He was head of the Swiss mission, and was direct supervisor of Carl Lutz. Jaeger played a role in opposing the deportation of Jews by the Nazi and Arrow Cross Party. He tried to dissuade the Nazis from deporting Jews to Auschwitz and to respect the neutrality of the 76 Swiss protected houses. The activities of Jaeger were instrumental in providing Lutz with the necessary conditions for the rescue of Jews in Budapest. Lutz later said that Jaeger always allowed him a good deal of freedom of action, and had total confidence in him.

In February 1945, the Soviets arrested Jaeger and Harald Feller and sent him to Moscow, along with other Swiss nationals. They both were returned to Switzerland in February 1946 in exchange for two pilots who defected to Switzerland.

== See also ==
- Carl Lutz
- Harald Feller
