= Up All Night (Khalid song) =

2019 single by Khalid

Single by Khalid
- Released: November 14, 2019
- Genre: R&B
- Length: 2:38
- Label: RCA
- Songwriters: Khalid Robinson; Jamil Chammas; Jeremy Malvin
- Producers: Digi; Chrome Sparks

Khalid singles chronology
"Trigger" (2019)	"Up All Night" (2019)	"Eleven" (2020)

"Up All Night" is a song by American singer-songwriter Khalid. It was released as a single through RCA Records on November 14, 2019. Khalid wrote the song with producers Digi and Chrome Sparks.

== Background ==
In a statement, Khalid said that he wrote "Up All Night" while he was on his Free Spirit World Tour:

"Up All Night" is a song that I wrote while on tour. It's really special to me and I'm so excited that I am able to share it with my fans so quickly. I've been touring around the world, and interacting with my fans each night has been really inspiring. I'm working hard on some more new music to share with you guys soon!

Before the release of the song, Khalid sent it to his mother via text message. She wrote: "I love the energy the song gives me!". Khalid jokingly replied: "Makes me wanna do the running man".

== Composition and lyrics ==
"Up All Night" is an "ethereal R&B jam" that is set in the key of C major. Lyrically, rather than Khalid's usual songs about relationships, he uses the song to be more introspective about his life and the thoughts that keep him up all night. A "mellow" song, he "sings over a spare, bouncy beat" before the song rises even further: "Take me around the world and back again / As I'm searching for my soul out there / Oh, there's something that I'm wondering / Where I'm going when my story ends". He uses falsetto in the chorus: "Keeps me up all night / Keeps me / Get these thoughts that keep me up all night / Keeps me / Keeps me up all night / Keeps me".

== Charts ==
Chart performance for "Up All Night"
Chart (2019–2020)	Peak position
Australia (ARIA)	35
Belgium (Ultratip Bubbling Under Flanders)	18
Belgium (Ultratip Wallonia)	21
Canada Hot 100 (Billboard)	79
Ireland (IRMA)	32
Lithuania (AGATA)	12
New Zealand (Recorded Music NZ)	36
Norway (VG-lista)	33
Portugal (AFP)	155
Slovakia Singles Digital (ČNS IFPI)	85
Sweden Heatseeker (Sverigetopplistan)	2
UK Singles (OCC)	55
US Billboard Hot 100	89
US Hot R&B/Hip-Hop Songs (Billboard)	42
US Rhythmic Airplay (Billboard)	22

== Certifications ==
Certifications for "Up All Night"
Region	Certification	Certified units/sales
Australia (ARIA)	Gold	35,000^{‡}
Brazil (Pro-Música Brasil)	Gold	20,000^{‡}
New Zealand (RMNZ)	Platinum	30,000^{‡}
United Kingdom (BPI)	Silver	200,000^{‡}
^{‡} Sales+streaming figures based on certification alone.
