= Mystery (Blk Jks EP) =

2009 album by Blk Jks

EP by Blk Jks
- Released: March 10, 2009
- Genre: Indie rock, Afropop
- Length: 19:29
- Label: Secretly Canadian

Blk Jks chronology
Mystery (2009)	After Robots (2009)

Mystery is an EP by South African indie rock band Blk Jks. It was released on March 10, 2009, on Secretly Canadian Records, and is the band's debut release.

== Critical reception ==
Mystery received generally favorable reviews from music critics. According to Metacritic, based on 7 reviews, the EP has a score of 80 out of 100, indicating "generally favorable reviews".

Professional ratings
Aggregate scores
Source	Rating
Metacritic	(80/100)
Review scores
Source	Rating
AllMusic	4/5 stars
The Observer	4/5 stars
Robert Christgau	(dud)
PopMatters	8/10 stars
Drowned in Sound	(8/10)
Exclaim!	(favorable)

== Track listing ==
No.	Title	Length
1.	"Lakeside"	4:11
2.	"Mystery"	5:49
3.	"Summertime"	4:28
4.	"It's in Every Thing You'll See"	5:01
