= Zol! =

EP by BLK JKS
- Released: June 8, 2010
- Genre: Indie rock, art rock
- Length: 24:34
- Label: Secretly Canadian

BLK JKS chronology
| After Robots (2009) | Zol! (2010) |

Zol! is an EP by South African indie rock band BLK JKS. It was released on June 8, 2010 on Secretly Canadian Records; this date was chosen to coincide with the band's performance at the 2010 World Cup opening concert in Soweto, South Africa. The EP's title is slang for "spliff" in South Africa.

== Critical reception ==
Professional ratings
Review scores
| Source | Rating |
|---|---|
| AllMusic | 3.5/5 stars |
| Exclaim! | (mixed) |
| Robert Christgau | (2-star Honorable Mention) |
| The New York Times | (mixed) |
| PopMatters | 6/10 stars |

PopMatters' Mike Schiller gave Zol! 6 stars out of 10, and described the title track as "an energetic but lightweight football chant." He concluded by writing that "BLK JKS is capable of much more than the call-and-response near-pandering of “ZOL!”; hopefully the rest of the world gets to hear everything else, too." Chris Coplan wrote that the EP was "steeped in South African culture and history", and described "Mzabalazo" as "the band’s take on an ’80s anti-apartheid street protest, the kind of song sung in the streets by young people on their way to work and play."

== Track listing ==
| No. | Title | Length |
|---|---|---|
| 1. | "IIETYS" | 6:02 |
| 2. | "Bogobe" | 4:16 |
| 3. | "Zol!" | 3:16 |
| 4. | "Paradise" | 6:57 |
| 5. | "Mzabalazo" | 4:03 |
