= Qué Calor =

2019 song by Major Lazer featuring J Balvin and El Alfa

Single by Major Lazer featuring J Balvin and El Alfa

from the album Music Is the Weapon
- Language: Spanish
- English title: "It's so Hot"
- Released: September 11, 2019
- Genre: Latin
- Length: 2:49
- Label: Mad Decent
- Songwriters: Alejandro Ramírez; Andre Murilo da Silva; Antonio Fernandez; Emmanuel Herrera Batista; Jose Henrique Castanho de Godoy; Pinheiro; José Álvaro Osorio Balvín; Sonia Bazanta; Thomas Pentz; Tyshane Thompson; Wissem Larfaoui
- Producers: Diplo; Tropkillaz; Dee Mad

Major Lazer singles chronology
"Make It Hot" (2019)	"Qué Calor" (2019)	"Trigger" (2019)

J Balvin singles chronology
"Indeciso" (2019)	"Qué Calor" (2019)	"Qué Pena" (2019)

El Alfa singles chronology
"Imagínate" (2019)	"Qué Calor" (2019)	"Coronao Now" (2019)

Music video
- "Que Calor" on YouTube

"Qué Calor" (transl. So Hot) is a song recorded by American electronic dance music trio Major Lazer featuring Colombian singer J Balvin and Dominican rapper El Alfa. It was released on September 11, 2019, through Diplo's label Mad Decent. It is the second single from Major Lazer's fourth studio album Music Is the Weapon, which was released in 2020. This also marks the second collaboration between Major Lazer and J Balvin, after "Buscando Huellas" in 2017. The artists also released a lyric translation of the track in English.

== Background ==
One week before, Major Lazer announced the date of the release and posted a snippet of the track on social networks. They also said to Billboard, "J Balvin and El Alfa both are two of the most exciting artists currently working to us, and artists that we have longstanding relationships with. We've collaborated with Latin artists from the very beginning of Major Lazer -- I think many Americans forget how much of the Caribbean is Spanish-speaking, and that's a huge part of our influences. There's so much energy in Latin music right now and we love helping bring it back home." Diplo said too, "Sorry I was late on the song of the summer." The song is part of the FIFA 20 and FIFA 23 game soundtrack and in the FIFA 20 "Volta Football" new mode. The official soundtrack of FIFA 20 was also released via Spotify, Apple, and Deezer on September 13.

Indian rapper Badshah released an official remix of the song on November 15, 2019. On this occasion, he said, "It is a huge pleasure for me to be on the 'Que calor' India Remix. I loved the track the moment I heard it. Major Lazer are dance music legends, I have worked with them in the past and I truly believe they have a major role in shaping the current global sound. J Balvin is a rockstar whom I really look up to and I think El Alfa has done an extraordinary job. It gives me honour and pleasure to be collaborating with these stars and bring Que calor to India." Major Lazer added, "We just dropped an official remix of Que Calor with Badshah, who brings serious heat. India holds a special place in our hearts and our Indian fans have given so much love back to us to our songs, so it was time for us to give something special to them." A week later, on November 22, 2019, the track was also remixed by California rapper Saweetie.

== Critical reception ==
Kat Bein from Billboard described the song as "a steamy banger for peak club hours". Writing for Dancing Astronaut, Farrell Sweeney called it a feel-good song. According to him, it's the perfect trigger to get the listener dancing. In parallel, Brian Bonavoglia from DJ Times noted the track as a robust dancefloor anthem with summertime vibes alive. Katie Stone from EDM.com said that "Que Calor" is a vibrant track and a melding of cultures with a dancehall-dembow rhythm that looks like El Alfa style. In the same way, Mike Wass from Idolator called the song "a rump-shaking floorfiller with enough hooks to demolish the language barrier." The flute at the beginning of the track was seen as a cover of 1993 Colombian cumbia classic "Curura" by the Afro-Colombian singer Totó la Momposina with modern pop influences. Keely Quinlan from Stereogum described the song as "an oriental-sounding flute plays, an infectious central melody, underscored by a speedy, tinny rhythm section".

== Music videos ==
The official music video of the song was released at the same day through Major Lazer's YouTube channel. The music video was directed by the VMA and BET Award-winning Colin Tilley, who worked on videos of "Alright" by Kendrick Lamar, "Mask Off" by Future and "Anaconda" by Nicki Minaj. It was produced by Jamee Ranta and Jack Winter, and orchestrated by choreographer Calvit Hodge. There are girls dancers around the artists, in a dark atmosphere, like in the clip of "Lean On". The girls in the clip are Major Lazer usual dancers, the Lazer Gyals, Sara Bivens and Helen Gedlu. The video sees Diplo in a cow-print getup complete with a printed cowboy hat, around flames, while J Balvin and El Alfa spit fire. Farrell Sweeney from Dancing Astronaut also noted the dynamic visual accompaniment to the dance-worthy single.

On October 3, 2019, Major Lazer posted on their YouTube channel an official dance video directed by Calvit Hodge. Then, on November 1, 2019, J Balvin released through his YouTube channel a dance video compilation. To implement this third clip, the artists asked their fans to give videos showing them dancing on the song. Then, a compilation of their movements was made, accompanied by many dancers and including appearances from American rapper and songwriter Lil Pump, America's Got Talent's Kid The Wiz and YouTuber Lele Pons.

== Commercial performance ==
In the week ending September 19, the song made a 487% gain in sales in the United States in its first full tracking week as it sold 4,000 downloads, according to Nielsen Music. Two weeks after the release, it climbed to number one on the US Latin Digital Songs chart, peaked at number 20 on the US Latin Streaming Songs chart, and at number 13 on the US Hot Latin Songs chart. This single also marks the first time that Major Lazer joins the list of seventeen DJs who have entered Latin Digital Song Sales in 2019.

== Track listing ==
Digital download
No.	Title	Length
1.	"Que Calor" (featuring J Balvin and El Alfa)	2:49

Digital download – Michael Bibi's 6am Dub
No.	Title	Length
1.	"Que Calor" (with J Balvin and El Alfa) (Michael Bibi's 6am Dub)	6:13

Digital download – Badshah Remix
No.	Title	Length
1.	"Qué Calor" (with J Balvin) (Badshah Remix)	2:41

Digital download – Saweetie Remix
No.	Title	Length
1.	"Que Calor" (with J Balvin) (Saweetie Remix)	2:32

Digital download – Good Times Ahead Remix
No.	Title	Length
1.	"Que Calor" (with J Balvin and El Alfa) (Good Times Ahead Remix)	3:26

Digital download – La Fuente Remix
No.	Title	Length
1.	"Que Calor" (with J Balvin and El Alfa) (La Fuente Remix)	4:05

Digital download – Remixes
No.	Title	Length
1.	"Que Calor" (with J Balvin and El Alfa)	2:49
2.	"Que Calor" (with J Balvin) (Saweetie Remix)	2:32
3.	"Que Calor" (with J Balvin) (Badshah Remix)	2:41
4.	"Que Calor" (with J Balvin and El Alfa) (Michael Bibi's 6am Dub)	6:13
5.	"Que Calor" (with J Balvin and El Alfa) (Good Times Ahead Remix)	3:26
6.	"Que Calor" (with J Balvin and El Alfa) (La Fuente Remix)	4:05
7.	"Que Calor" (with J Balvin and El Alfa) (Sunnery James & Ryan Marciano Remix)	2:59
8.	"Que Calor" (with J Balvin and El Alfa) (Damien N-Drix Remix)	2:51
9.	"Que Calor" (with J Balvin and El Alfa) (Redfield Remix)	5:11
10.	"Que Calor" (with J Balvin and El Alfa) (Aazar Remix)	2:24

Streaming – Que Calor EP
No.	Title	Length
1.	"Diplomatico" (featuring Guaynaa)	2:24
2.	"QueLoQue" (featuring Paloma Mami)	2:45
3.	"Que Calor" (featuring J Balvin and El Alfa)	2:49
4.	"Buscando Huellas" (featuring J Balvin and Sean Paul)	2:53
5.	"En la Cara" (featuring Karol G) (Sua Cara Remix)	2:49
6.	"Watch Out for This" (featuring Busy Signal, The Flexican and FS Green) (Daddy Yankee Remix)	4:26
7.	"Know No Better" (featuring Travis Scott, Camila Cabello and Quavo) (Bad Bunny Remix)	3:00
8.	"Lean On" (with DJ Snake featuring MØ) (J Balvin and Farruko Remix)	3:51
Total length:		25:37

== Credits and personnel ==
Credits adapted from Tidal.

- Andre Murilo da Silva – production, composition, lyrics
- Jose Henrique Castanho de Godoy – production, composition, lyrics
- Thomas Pentz – production, composition, lyrics
- Wissem Larfaoui – production, composition, lyrics
- Alejandro Ramírez – composition, lyrics
- Antonio Fernandez – composition, lyrics
- Emmanuel Herrera Batista – composition, lyrics
- José Álvaro Osorio Balvín – composition, lyrics
- Pinheiro – composition, lyrics
- Sonia Bazanta – composition, lyrics
- Tyshane Thompson – composition, lyrics

== Charts ==
=== Weekly charts ===
Chart (2019–2020)	Peak position
Argentina Hot 100 (Billboard)	70
Belgium (Ultratip Bubbling Under Flanders)	11
Belgium (Ultratop 50 Wallonia)	28
Chile (Monitor Latino)	18
Colombia (National-Report)	47
Croatia (HRT)	100
El Salvador (Monitor Latino)	13
France (SNEP)	14
Guatemala (Monitor Latino)	8
Honduras (Monitor Latino)	6
Hungary (Single Top 40)	37
Italy (FIMI)	48
Mexico Airplay (Billboard)	32
Netherlands (Single Top 100)	91
New Zealand Hot Singles (RMNZ)	39
Nicaragua (Monitor Latino)	1
Panama (Monitor Latino)	15
Portugal (AFP)	98
Puerto Rico (Monitor Latino)	4
Spain (PROMUSICAE)	18
Switzerland (Schweizer Hitparade)	53
US Bubbling Under Hot 100 (Billboard)	23
US Dance Club Songs (Billboard)	45
US Hot Dance/Electronic Songs (Billboard)	6
US Hot Latin Songs (Billboard)	13
US Latin Airplay (Billboard)	13
US Rhythmic Airplay (Billboard)	37
Venezuela (Monitor Latino)	17

=== Year-end charts ===
Chart (2019)	Position
France (SNEP)	183
US Hot Dance/Electronic Songs (Billboard)	41
US Hot Latin Songs (Billboard)	87

Chart (2020)	Position
France (SNEP)	77
US Hot Dance/Electronic Songs (Billboard)	17
US Hot Latin Songs (Billboard)	52

== Certifications ==
Region	Certification	Certified units/sales
Brazil (Pro-Música Brasil)	Platinum	40,000^{‡}
France (SNEP)	Diamond	333,333^{‡}
Italy (FIMI)	Platinum	70,000^{‡}
Portugal (AFP)	Gold	5,000^{‡}
Spain (Promusicae)	2× Platinum	120,000^{‡}
Switzerland (IFPI Switzerland)	Gold	10,000^{‡}
United States (RIAA)	Gold	500,000^{‡}
^{‡} Sales+streaming figures based on certification alone.
