= Gertrud Lutz-Fankhauser =

Swiss humanitarian activist (1911–1995)

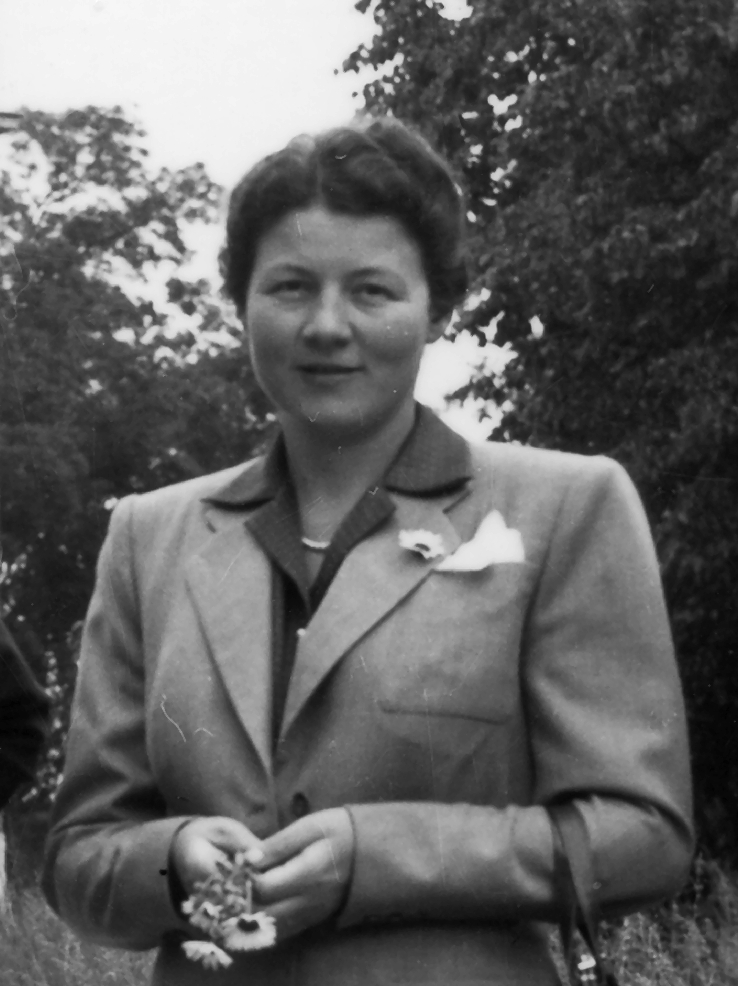
Gertrud Lutz in 1944

Gertrud Lutz-Fankhauser (7 March 1911 – 29 June 1995) was a Swiss humanitarian activist. For a quarter of a century she undertook work for the UNICEF, serving in successively more senior capacities between the organisation's foundation and 1966. She then served between 1966 and 1971, as UNICEF vice-president and director for Europe and North Africa.

Her nomination, jointly with her ex-husband, in 1964 as Switzerland's first two "Righteous Among the Nations" related to an earlier stage in her life however: it was a recognition of the couple's role in rescuing an estimated 62,000 Jews from slaughter during her husband's posting as the Swiss vice-consul in Budapest, and following the invasion of Hungary by the forces of Nazi Germany in March 1944.

== Life ==
=== Provenance and early years ===
Gertrud Fankhauser was born in Rechthalten (Fribourg), a little town in the mountains south of Bern. Her father was a cheese maker. After attending business schools in Fribourg and Bern, still aged only 18, she emigrated to the USA in search of adventure. Between 1931 and 1934 she undertook office work at the Swiss consulate in St. Louis (Missouri). It was here that she met Carl Lutz, a junior Swiss diplomat originally from Appenzell. Gertrud Fankhauser and Carl Lutz returned together to Switzerland, and in January 1935 married at the fashionable St. Paul's Church in Bern.

=== Diplomat's wife in (British) Palestine ===
Following a last minute change of plan on the part of the Swiss authorities their honeymoon was cancelled. Instead, at the end of January 1935 the couple travelled to Jaffa (as it was then commonly known) in Palestine, which since 1922 had been administered, at least for most practical purposes, as a relatively fractious territory of the British Empire. Here Carl Lutz took up an appointment as a Swiss consular official: Gertrud worked alongside him, supplying (unpaid) clerical support. At some point between 1937 and 1939 (sources differ) they were relocated to nearby Tel Aviv from where, as the wife of an increasingly senior Swiss consular official, Gertrud Lutz experienced at close hand the unfolding Palestinian civil war.

Following the outbreak of the Second World War in September 1939, diplomatic relations between belligerent states were wound down or broken off. Switzerland, with a tradition of neutrality stretching back to 1815, suddenly found itself accepting requests to provide diplomatic and consular services around the world on behalf of various governments that no longer wished to pursue diplomatic interactions directly. Diplomatic relations between Britain and Germany were broken off. At the Swiss consulate in (British) Palestine Carl Lutz was placed in charge of diplomatic representation in behalf of several foreign countries including Germany, which since 1933 had been governed as a one-party dictatorship. Alongside an enormous increase in administrative work, and having to work with various National Socialist agencies, representing Germany diplomatically in Palestine also involved coping with a massive level of humanitarian and social work. In handling these responsibilities the formidable organisational abilities of Gertrud Lutz came to the fore. One of the largest tasks for Gertrud involved looking after the women, children and old people among the German citizens - many of them political or racial refugees - who had been interned in camps by the British authorities. Another major responsibility involved creating and sustaining contacts with large numbers of German Jews in the territory who had suddenly found themselves rendered stateless in 1935 as a result of the Nuremberg [race] Laws. Through their diplomatic and consular work together in Palestine Carl and Gertrud Lutz built up experience and established contacts internationally that would prove invaluable through the challenges ahead, notably during their posting in Budapest.

After the transfer of the "German interest section" in Palestine of the Swiss consular department to Spain Carl Lutz was returned to Switzerland in the autumn of 1940. Gertrud Lutz stayed on, liaising closely with the British military authorities, and looking after the German women and children whom the British had identified as "enemy aliens" when the war broke out, and who continued to be detained in camps. She left Palestine to re-join her husband only in October 1941.

=== During the war years in Budapest ===
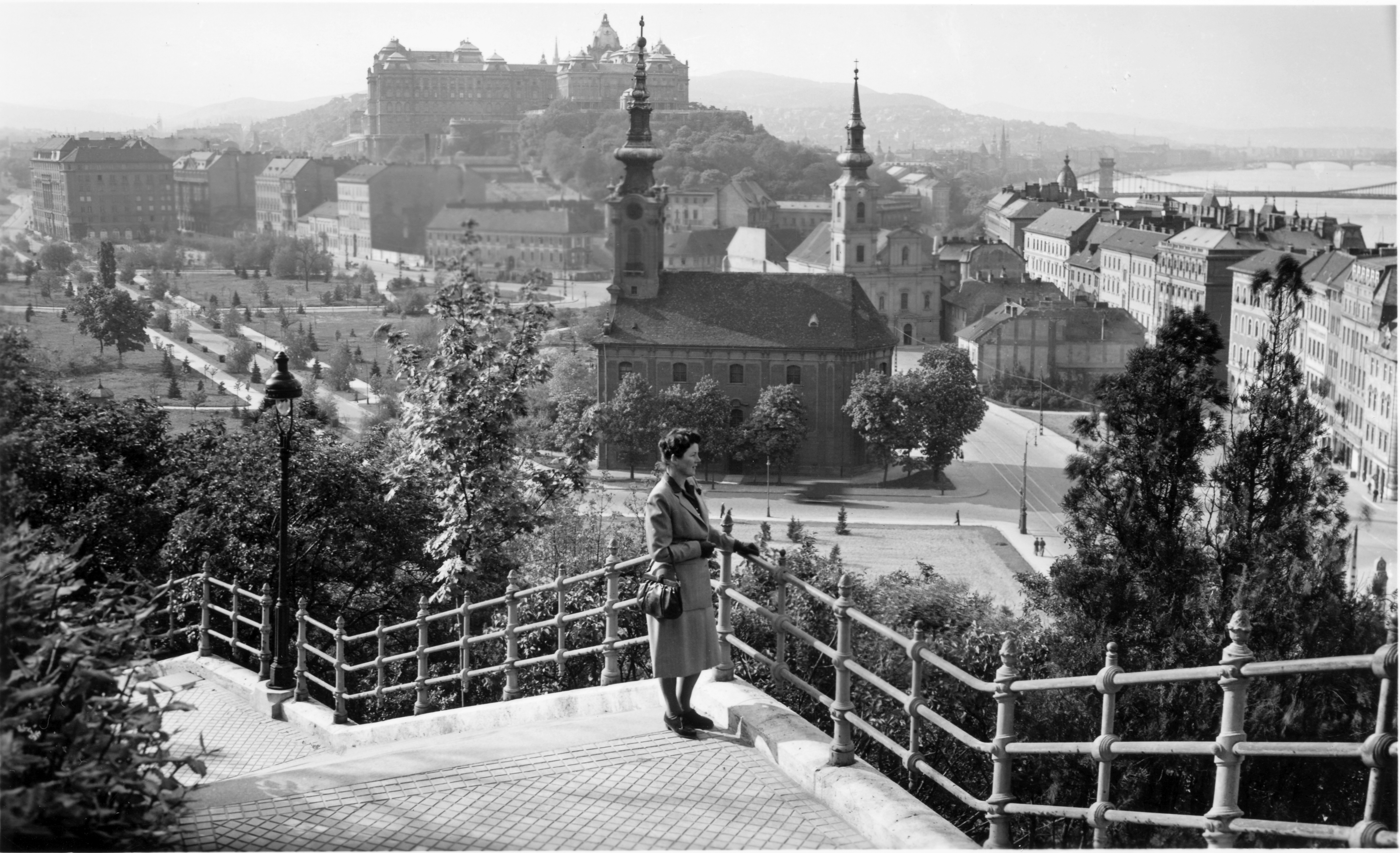
Gertrud Lutz on the stairs of Gellért Hill

Between January 1942 and the spring of 1945 Gertrud Lutz lived with her husband in Budapest. While they had been apart, the Swiss Foreign Minister Giuseppe Motta, in recognition of his remarkable contribution and that of his wife during their time in Palestine, had promoted Carl Lutz to the rank of vice-consul. During 1941 he had been representing the interests of Yugoslavia in Berlin. In January 1942 he was appointed to head up the foreign interests section at the Swiss embassy in Budapest. It was a prestigious posting but also an inherently complicated one. At various stages he represented the interests of up to fourteen foreign states which found themselves at war with Hungary. These included the United States and Great Britain, along with its dominions round the world (including Palestine). At the time of their posting to Budapest, Hungary was allied to Germany. Lutz seems to have been viewed in some quarters as a somewhat "restless and anti-bureaucratic" vice-consul, but the circumstances under which he was operating were also far from normal. He ran his department of 18 consular staff from an office in the former United States embassy building. By the time the Germans had lost trust in the Hungarian government sufficiently to invade the country, early in 1944, Lutz had used his vice-consular office in Budapest to issue approximately 5,000 exit visas to Jewish refugees desperate to emigrate to Palestine. According to other sources, by the time of the German invasion he had "aided by his wife and helpers .... helped some 10,000 [Jews] to emigrate to Palestine".

Starting in the summer of 1944 the numbers involved were scaled up, with the issuance of the so-called "collective" protection documents and passes. As the German military authorities began the grim task of herding the Jewish population of Budapest into ghettos, approximately 30,000 people received protection in their homes from protection documents issued by the Swiss vice-consul, with 76 houses designated as buildings under Swiss diplomatic protection. Limited quotas of protection documents that Lutz had been allocated in the anticipation that they would be used for individuals were instead adapted so that each applied to entire family units, this increasing the number of people protected. Lutz's team engaged in constant legalistic wrangles to ensure that the diplomatic protections were respected under wartime conditions, but with the German forces accustomed to following rules and frightened of the consequences of not doing so, the protective documents issued and administered on behalf of neutral Switzerland were widely respected by soldiers on the ground through most of 1944.

Between December 1944 and February 1945, during the 50-day Soviet blockade of Budapest, Carl and Gertrud Lutz looked after "more than 50" people who were hidden in the basement of the Swiss embassy buildings, which now included not merely the pre-war Swiss embassy building but also the former embassies of states that were now, following the severing of direct diplomatic relations, being represented by the foreign interest section of the much expended Swiss diplomatic estate. The cellar of the burned out former British embassy building was being used to hide, according to one of them interviewed in 2017, roughly thirty people.

=== New beginnings ===
- "These tragic events [in Palestine (1935-1941) and Budapest (1942-1944], followed by a seven week siege during the Battle over Budapest, more than brought home to me that during wars, as in natural catastrophes, children and mothers are always those suffering most."
  Gertrud Lutz, interviewed by Reinhard Freiberg at her home in Gunten, 24 April 1984

One of the more significant of the thousands of letters of protection issued by the Swiss head of the foreign interests section in the Budapest embassy was one dated 1 July 1944 in favour of Magdalena Grausz, described in some sources as his domestic servant or maid. Carl Lutz fell in love with Magdalena. In April 1945 Carl and Gertrud Lutz were able to return to Switzerland. Carl Lutz "received an official reprimand for his actions in Budapest". At the official level, recognition came only much later. The end of the war provided an opportunity for Gertrud and Carl Lutz to divorce, which they did in 1946. Carl Lutz married Magda Grausz and adopted her baby daughter, Agnes "Agi" Grausz. More than ten years spent looking after those displaced by war had left Gertrud Lutz-Fankhauser with a formidable breadth and depth of experience in the organisation, provision and administration of welfare assistance to children traumatised and orphaned by the slaughter and deeper atrocities of war. There was much to be done.

=== Don Suisse ===
- "[After the war. . .] I wanted to devote all my time and strength towards helping children and mothers."
  Gertrud Lutz, interviewed by Reinhard Freiberg at her home in Gunten, 24 April 1984

In January 1946 Gertrud Lutz-Fankhauser joined "Don suisse", which involved working in Yugoslavia, where she organised the distribution of "badly needed clothing and shoes to the populations of war-devastated villages throughout Bosnia" (working in co-ordination with the Yugoslav Red Cross). She was transferred to Finland during 1947. A picture of Gertrud Lutz-Fankhauser with a Finnish child in her arms appeared during the first part of 1947 as the cover/title page of the weekly news magazine Schweizer Illustrierte and became, according to at least one source, a pictorial icon of Switzerland's post-war aid programme She then, in May 1947, moved on to Poland where in the first instance she served as "Don Suisse" representative. (Note: Schweizer Spende / Don suisse pour les victimes de la guerre / Dono svizzero / Donaziun svizra has been described as a coming together of the Swiss people for the victims of the war in eighteen European countries, including Germany. Its activities were jointly funded by national government, cantonal governments, municipalities, corporate donors and individuals. Interviewed 38 years later Gertrud Lutz herself described "Don Suisse" as a "semi-official relief organization created to assist civilian victims in war devastated countries".) "Don Suisse" operations came to an end in 1948. Some of the activities were taken on by other international organisations.

=== UNICEF ===
During 1947 or 1948 Lutz-Fankhauser came across Al Davidson, director of UNICEF's European office. It was he who offered her a job with UNICEF. She was employed as head of the UNICEF "mission to Poland" between July 1947 and the mission's closure in December 1950. (Note: Be aware that sources differ over the precise dates of her time heading up the UNICEF Poland mission.) Interviewed later, she recalled that the most important aspect of her mission in Poland was the feeding programme. There was no mass starvation, but the great majority of children were badly underweight, while the poor quality of the remaining housing caused an alarmingly high level of Tuberculosis, which meant that agencies including the Red Cross and UNICEF were called upon to provide extensive medical support along with the feeding programme. UNICEF also funded an anti-rickets campaign and short post-graduate study programmes in Switzerland for young Polish doctors. In Poland as in Germany most of the industrial capacity had been reduced to rubble during the war. During Lutz-Fankhauser's time running the UNICEF mission in Poland, in collaboration with the government and other agencies, UNICEF arranged vaccination programmes. They also supplied pasteurisation equipment for milk collection depots and set up five powdered milk factories.

Her longest and in many ways most successful posting was to Brazil where she headed up the UNICEF mission between 1951 and 1964. It was a period of rapid change. There were serious challenges to be addressed with respect to child nutrition and health issues in the remoter parts of the interior and north-east of the country. The high levels of currency depreciation and inflation presented challenges in respect of budgeting. Getting round the country became less of an issue after the capital was relocated to Brasília, since this was rapidly followed by a massive road building programme, which reduced dependency on ancient Douglas DC-3s. An initial challenge, rapidly overcome, was that Lutz-Fankhauser had never mastered Portuguese. However, mastering the language was not too easy, given the Latin origins that in many respects also surface in French she was also amused to find that some of the more nasal sounds used in Brazilian Portuguese were unexpectedly similar to vowel sounds familiar from the Bernese dialect which was the mother tongue with which she had grown up. In 1964 she agreed her transfer to Turkey only with reluctance, fearing the disruptive impact on UNICEF work in Brazil of a change in the organisation's management there. As matters turned out she was nevertheless received with great cordiality by colleagues at the UNICEF office in Turkey (where she was the only non-Turkish national on the organisation's payroll).

Gertrud Lutz was asked how she reacted to her enforced "return to Europe" in 1968, when she took over at the UNICEF Paris office as "Vice-president and director for Europe and North Africa":

- "... much as I knew that a highly challenging mission was awaiting me at the European office, I returned rather reluctantly, since I was fundamentally a field person, feeling closest to the people in poor areas of the countries I had been assigned to. For years I had been at the end where UNICEF was rendering its assistance. Paris ... meant seeking increased contributions from Governments and supporting National Committees in their fund-raising campaigns..."
  Gertrud Lutz, interviewed by Reinhard Freiberg at her home in Gunten, 24 April 1984

Lutz-Fankhauser's time in Turkey was relatively brief. To her initial astonishment, a priority defining much of her work there involved a large and very necessary UNICEF malaria eradication programme. The situation was particularly grim in the remoter regions, notably in the Kurdish provinces to the east. UNICEF supplied vehicles, equipment and insecticide. Insecticide formulations had to be changed several times as the mosquitoes adapted and acquired new immunities. The vehicles were also a problem. They were mostly Willys Jeeps sent over as kits and assembled at a manufactory in Istanbul. It turned out that roughly 100 of the 400 UNICEF Jeeps were "not in running condition". The drivers had received no training in vehicle maintenance. They had merely been given English language "manufacturers' instructions" and left to work them out. Some of the drivers had difficulty reading even Turkish: English was not widely understood beyond the merchant classes in the cities. One of the new mission chief's most pressing tasks was therefore to arrange hands-on vehicle maintenance courses for drivers and mechanics, and to have the manufacturers' documentation translated into Turkish. The drivers and the vehicles were critical elements in the malaria eradication programme, and while funding for the necessary training was released by UNICEF without demur, the launch of the lengthy exercise was significantly delayed by the Jeep problems. The eradication was in full swing, but still far from completed, when Gertrud Lutz-Fankhauser was moved on again in 1966, this time back to (western) Europe. Based (initially) in Paris she served between 1966 and 1971, as UNICEF Vice-president and director for Europe and North Africa, reluctantly reconciling herself to a more office-based style of working as she chain-smoked her way through endless meetings at which, frequently, she was the only woman present.

During the Biafra War (1868-1970 Gertrud Lutz temporarily relocated the centre of her operations from Paris to Geneva in order to be closer to the other international welfare and relief agencies engaged in trying to help the civilian population affected by the war. Under her direction UNICEF looked after around a million imperilled children both during the war and during the post-war period in the early 1970s. After retiring, formally in June 1971, Gertrud Lutz-Fankhauser retained close links with the UNICEF European and North African headquarters in Paris. She continued to appear at international congresses, representing UNICEF, and also built herself a broadly based career as a public speaker, the twin focus of her lectures being on the women's movement and on the peace movement.

=== "Retirement" ===
Gertrud Lutz-Fankhauser retired from her last UNICEF role just a few months after her sixtieth birthday. She now immersed herself in the municipal politics of Zollikofen (Bern), which was the little town in which she now settled in her parents' family home. Due in part to the centrality of referendums in the country's constitutional arrangements, political emancipation for women had arrived rather late in Switzerland, and in 1972 Lutz-Fankhauser became Zollikofen's first female town councillor. She was indeed the first female politician to secure election anywhere in the Canton of Bern . On the council she sat as a member of the national conservative People's Party ("Schweizerische Volkspartei" / "Union démocratique du centre"). Just as during her UNICEF years, as a town councillor she often found herself as the only woman on a committee comprising, otherwise, just men. Between 1972 and 1974 she was the Zollikofen councillor responsible for looking after the schools. After that she withdrew from the council due to the pressures on her time and energies from her continued duties on behalf of the UNICEF.

Gertrud Lutz-Fankhauser suffered a heart attack while travelling by train to Zürich for a "television event" in which she had been scheduled to participate, and died almost at once on 29 June 1995 at Burgdorf, just outside Bern,

== Archive ==
The principal archive on her life and works is held by the Gosteli Foundation at Worblaufen, just outsideZollikofen and near Bern. The foundation has translated its mission statement into English as follows: "Our aim is to commemorate the many women who have achieved so much and to ensure that they are never forgotten by future generations. [We] ... collect resources on the history of the Swiss women’s movement, preserve the archives of women’s organisations and individual women and run a library, an extensive collection of pamphlets and a collection of biographical notes."

Many of the papers that make up the literary estate of Gertrud Lutz wwre supplied after her death by Agnes Hirschi (formerly Agnes "Agi" Grausz, the little girl who became step daughter of Carl Lutz (and therefore, by some calculations, of his first wife) as a result of his marriage to Magdalena Grausz, his second wife. By the time Gerd Lutz died in 1995 it is apparent that the two women were in regular contact.
