= Morena Leraba =

Lesotho-born singer and rapper

- Born: Teboho Mochaoa; Ha-Mojela, Lesotho
- Origin: Lesotho
- Genres: Famo, Electronic, Famo, Hip hop
- Occupations: Rapper; singer
- Instrument: Vocals
- Years active: 2013–present
- Label: Blackmajor

Teboho Mochaoa, known commonly by his stage name Morena Leraba is a Lesotho-born singer and rapper. He mainly uses traditional Sesotho lyrics and combines them with electro, afro house and Hip hop. His lyrics are deeply rooted in Lesotho's traditional music, poetry, and its sub-genre, Afro.

== Early life and career ==
Morena Leraba grew up in the village of Ha-Mojela in Lesotho. He got exposed to a variety of music such as kwaito and the traditional music of Lesotho including the alternative and rock music by his older brother. He began his musical career in 2013, when he offered to try famo techniques on a rap song a compatriot was working on at the time. He made his first appearance on the international scene in 2014 when he was featured in the single "Do You Know Know Lesotho" by a Cape Town/German band, The Freerangers. He was first introduced to Carl McMillan, a filmmaker from Lesotho who discovered his talent then. During the same time, Morena was then introduced to the band, who were friends he studied with in Cape Town.

In 2016, he released his debut single, "Bojete". The single that got the attention of Brooklyn-based producer Kashaka, which led to a collaboration on the single, "Lithebera". He later collaborated with Brazil's TrapFunk & Alivio alongside Johannesburg's Mankind on the single "Impepho". He was also featured on Spoek Mathambo's 2017 album Mzansi Beat Code, and on the Blk Jks’ single, "Harare". He also featured on Damon Albarn's Africa Express EGOLI album, a process that spawned the "Johannesburg" single that went on to get played on BBC Radio 6. In March 2019, he was featured on the Major Lazer single "Hands Up", which also featured South African singer Moonchild Sanelly and also appeared on the SABC 3 television show, Afternoon Express.

He has performed as part of the arts and cultural program of the 2018 Commonwealth Games in Australia, performed at the Sentebale Audi fundraising concert in aid of the Duke of Sussex and Prince Seeiso’s Sentebale at the Hampton Court Palace in the United Kingdom, shut the show down at Afropunk Johannesburg in December 2019, MTN Bushfire Festival in Eswatini, Fak’ugesi Festival in Braamfontein, South African Human Rights Festival in Johannesburg, Banlieues Bleues Jazz Festival in Zanzibar, Cape Town Electronic Music Festival (CTEMF) in Cape Town and also played at several club and festival shows around Europe including the Oslo World Music Festival, Waltham Forest London Borough of Culture celebrations, Eurosonic Noorderslag, Fête de la Musique, Festival Rituel 2 and Rencontres Trans Musicales in Rennes, France.

== Discography ==
=== Singles ===
- 2016: Bojete (with Kashaka)
- 2019: Impepho (with TrapFunk & Alivio & Mankind)
- 2019: Harare (with Blk Jks)
- 2019: Johannesburg (with Africa Express)
- 2019: Hands Up (with Major Lazer & Moonchild Sanelly)
