= Carl Lutz =

Swiss diplomat (1895–1975)

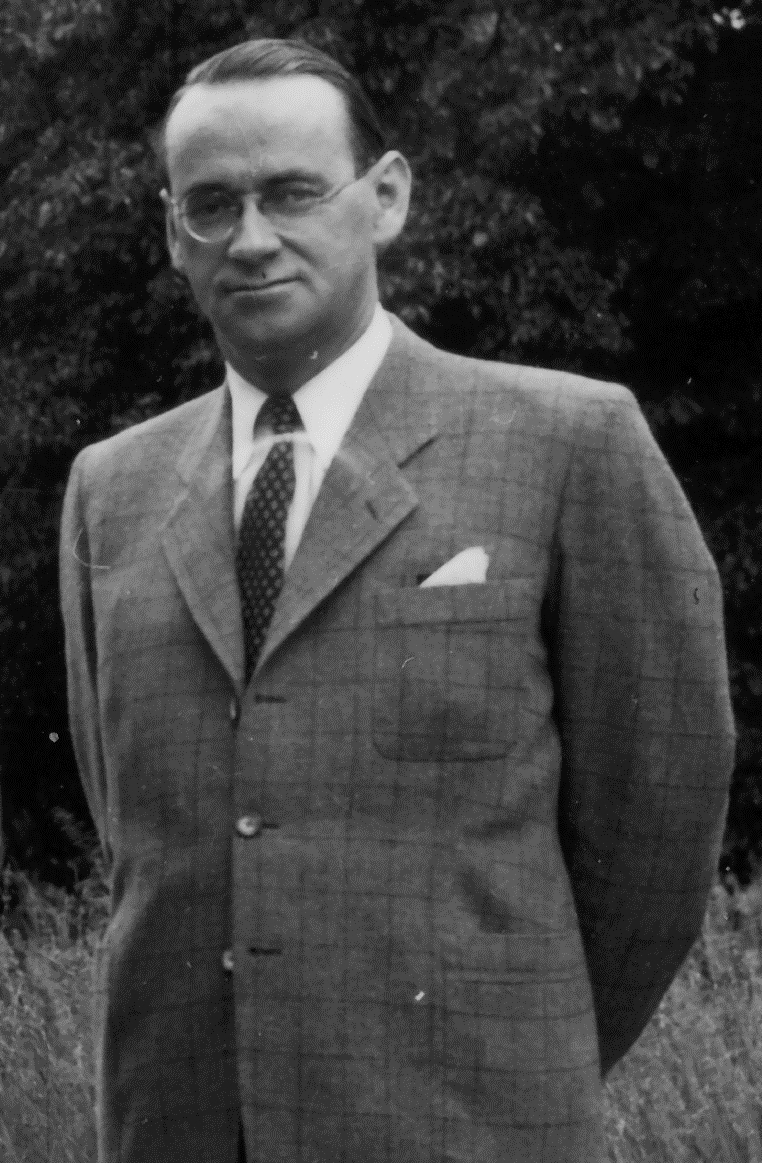
- Lutz in 1944

Swiss Vice-Consul to Hungary for Budapest
- In office January 1942 – 1945

Personal details
- Born: Karl Robert Lutz; 30 March 1895 Walzenhausen, Switzerland
- Died: 12 February 1975 (aged 79) Bern, Switzerland
- Citizenship: Switzerland; United States (since 1929)
- Spouse(s): Gertrud Fankhauser (m. 1935; div. 1946) Maria Magdalena Csányi Grausz (m. 1949)
- Children: 1 (adopted)
- Education: Central Wesleyan College; George Washington University (BA)

Carl Robert Lutz (30 March 1895 – 12 February 1975) was a Swiss diplomat who most notably served as the Swiss Vice Consul to Hungary in Budapest from 1942 until the end of World War II. He is credited with saving over 62,000 Jews during the Second World War in possibly the largest rescue operation of the Holocaust.

Due to his actions, half of the Jewish population of Budapest survived and were not deported to Nazi extermination camps during the Holocaust. He was awarded the title of Righteous Among the Nations by Yad Vashem.

== Early life and education ==
Lutz was born 30 March 1895 in Walzenhausen, Switzerland, one of ten children, to Johannes Lutz, a merchant who owned a sandstone quarry, and Ursula Lutz (née Künzler), into a Methodist family of modest prosperity.

In 1909, his mother passed away of tuberculosis. He attended the local schools and completed a commercial apprenticeship in a embroidery export firm in St. Margrethen. In 1913, aged 18, Lutz emigrated to the United States, initially settling in Saint Louis, Missouri, where he anglicized his name to Carl.

Initially he worked in Granite City, Illinois, from 1913–18 to earn money for college, and started his studies at Central Wesleyan College in Warrenton, Missouri, from 1918 to 1920. In 1920, Lutz found a job in the Swiss consular corps at the Swiss Legation in Washington, D.C. He continued his education there at George Washington University, where he received a bachelor's degree in 1924. During his time in Washington, D.C., Lutz lived in Dupont Circle. He continued to work for the Swiss Legation.

== Diplomatic career ==
In 1926, Lutz was appointed as chancellor at the Swiss Consulate in Philadelphia, United States. He next was assigned to the Swiss Consulate in St. Louis, and served in total from 1926 to 1934 in the two cities.

Lutz left the United States after more than 20 years. He was assigned in January 1935 as vice-consul to the Swiss Consulate General in Jaffa, in what was then Mandatory Palestine. In 1936, from their apartment he and his wife saw an unarmed Jew being lynched by an Arab crowd. He served there until 1942.

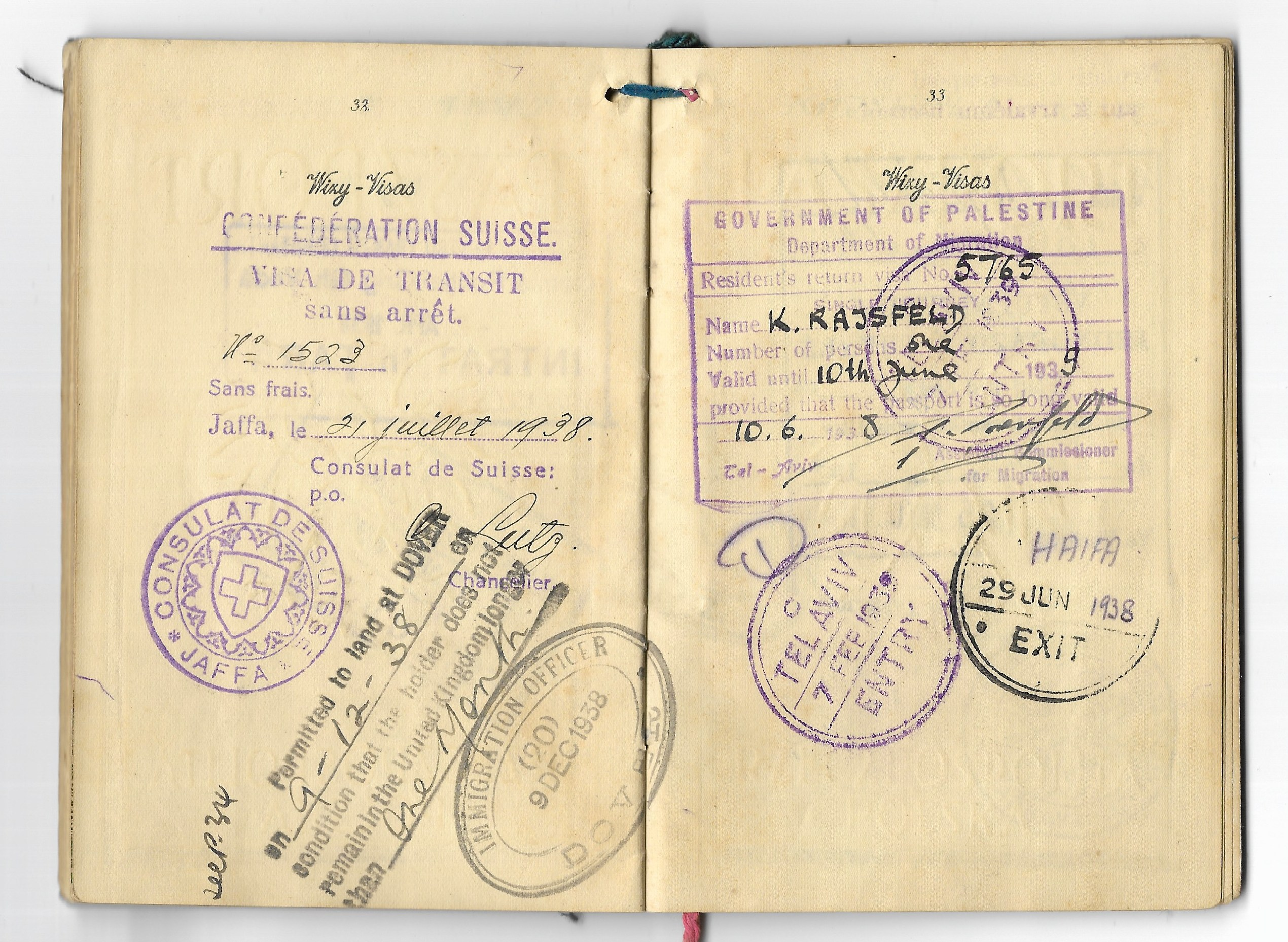
Visa issued by Carl Lutz from his posting in British Palestine – 1938, Jaffa

=== Actions during the Second World War ===
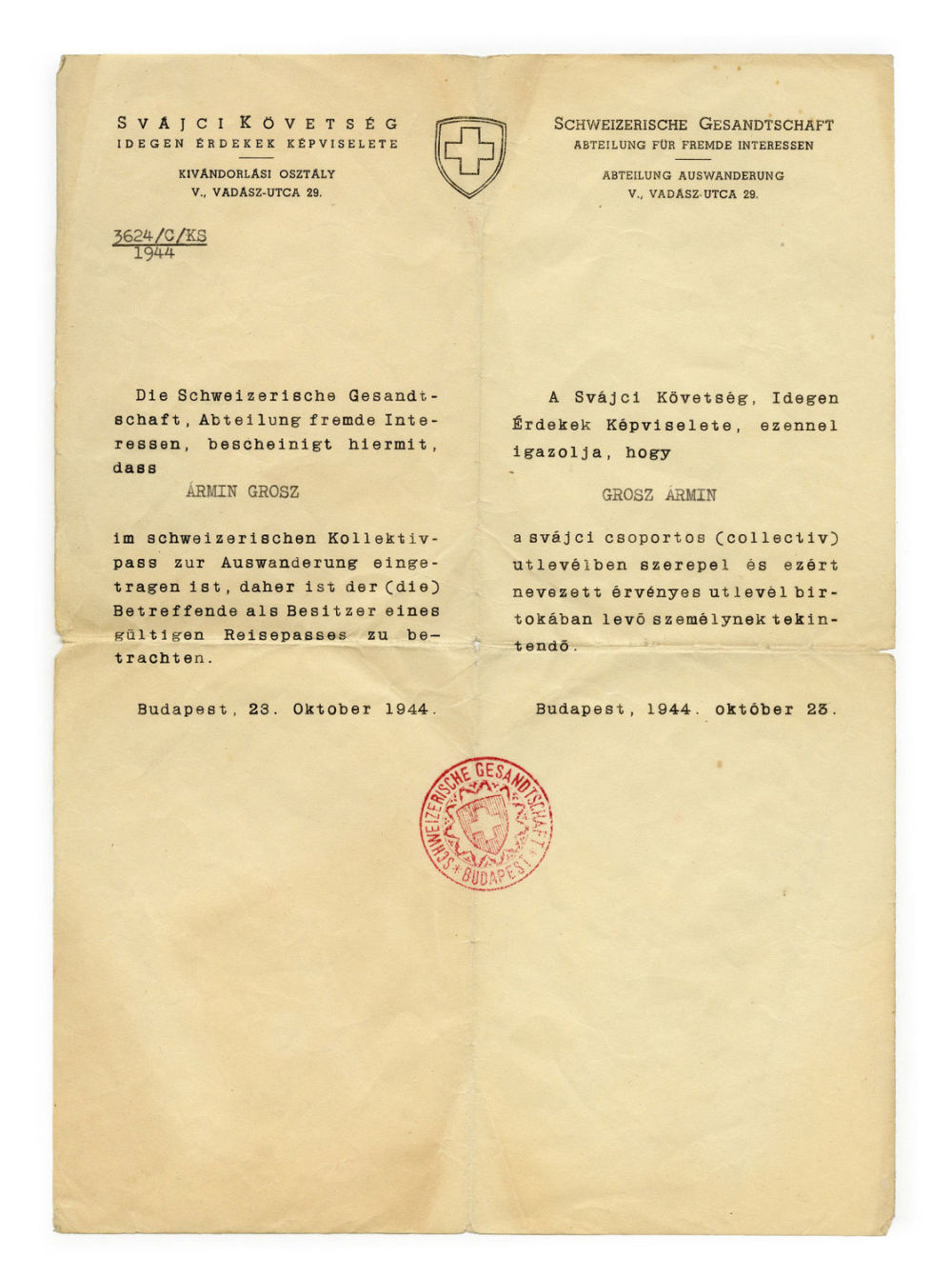
Letter of protection issued by Carl Lutz in 1944. Today in the collection of the Jewish Museum of Switzerland.

Appointed in 1942 as Swiss vice-consul in Budapest, Hungary, Lutz soon began cooperating with the Jewish Agency for Israel. He issued Swiss safe-conduct documents that enabled almost 10,000 Hungarian Jewish children to emigrate, and saved over 62,000 Jews.

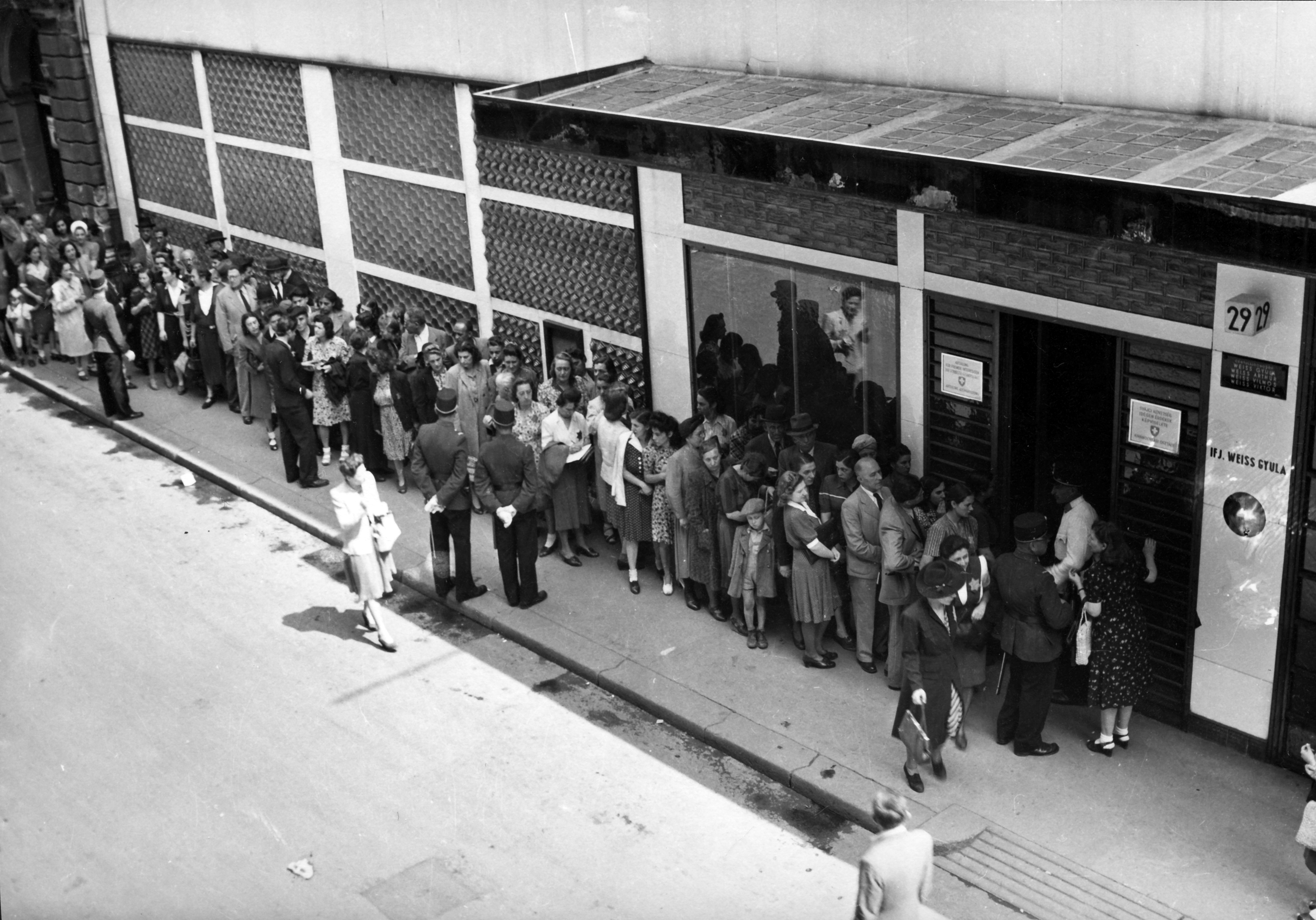
Jewish people waiting in line at the Glass House (Üvegház) in Budapest, 1944. This photograph may have been taken by Agnes Hirschi, Carl Lutz's step-daughter, then a very young child.

Once the Nazis took over Budapest in 1944, they began deporting Jews to the death camps. Lutz negotiated a special deal with the Hungarian government and the Nazis. He gained permission to issue protective letters to 8,000 Hungarian Jews for emigration to Palestine.

Lutz deliberately used his permission for 8,000 as applying to families rather than individuals, and proceeded to issue tens of thousands of additional protective letters, all of them bearing a number between one and 8,000. He also set up some 76 "safe houses" around Budapest, declaring them annexes of the Swiss legation and thus off-limits to Hungarian forces or Nazi soldiers. Among the safe houses was the now well known "Glass House" (Üvegház) at Vadász Street 29. About 3,000 Hungarian Jews found refuge at the Glass House and in a neighboring building.

One day, in front of the fascist Arrow Cross Party militiamen while they fired at Jews, Lutz jumped in the Danube River to save a bleeding Jewish woman along the quay that today bears his name in Budapest (Carl Lutz Rakpart). With water up to his chest and covering his suit, the consul swam back to the bank with her and asked to speak to the Hungarian officer in charge of the firing squad. Declaring the wounded woman a foreign citizen protected by Switzerland and quoting international covenants, the Swiss consul brought her back to his car in front of the stunned fascists and left quietly. Fearing to shoot at this tall man who seemed to be important and spoke so eloquently, no one dared to stop him.

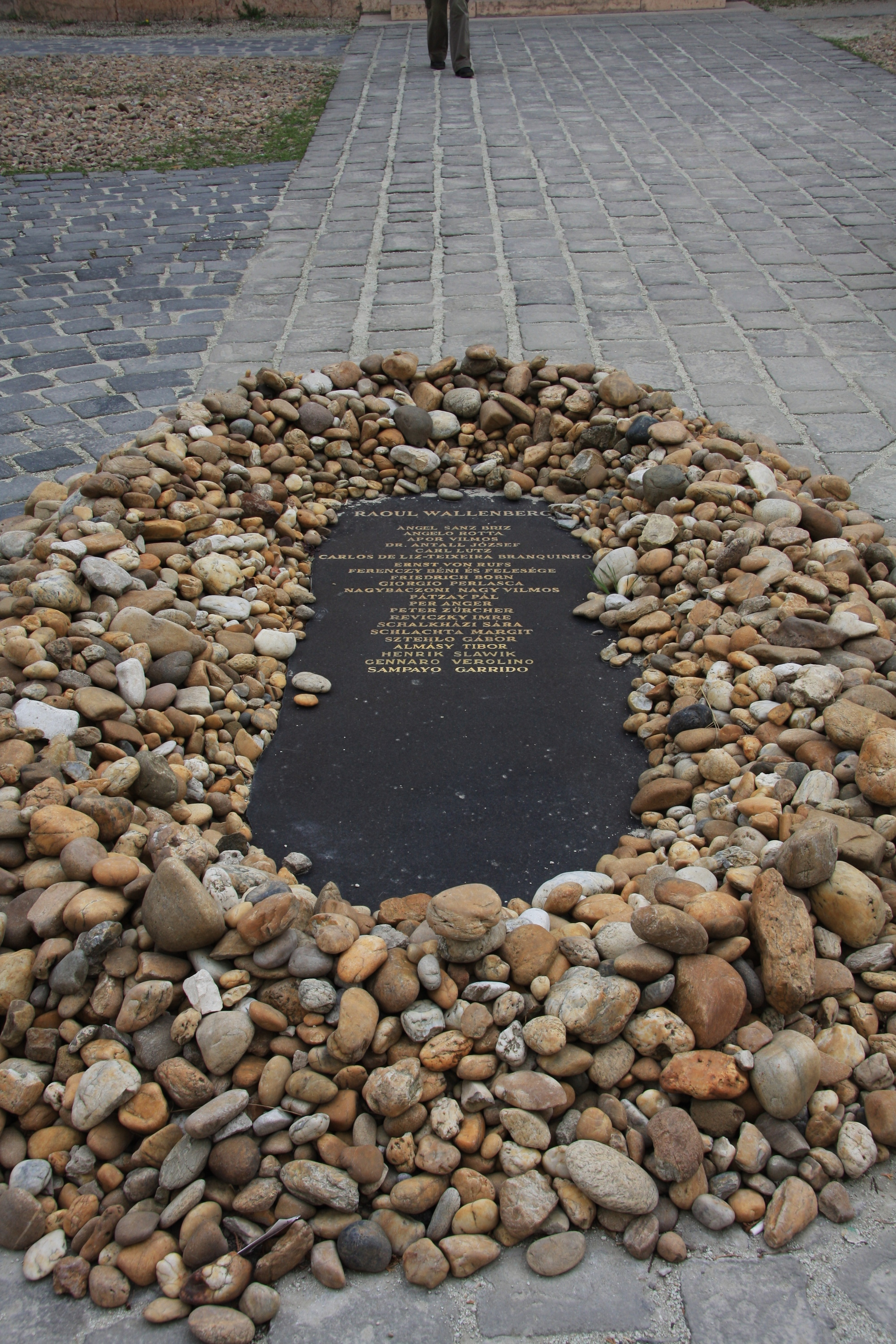
The Raoul Wallenberg-memorial at the Dohány Street Synagogue in Budapest. Lutz's name shows together with other heroes.

Together with other diplomats of neutral countries, such as Raoul Wallenberg, appointed at the Swedish embassy, Carlos de Liz-Texeira Branquinho and Sampaio Garrido at the Portuguese Embassy, Angelo Rotta, the Apostolic nuncio of the Holy See; Angel Sanz Briz, the Spanish Minister, later followed by Giorgio Perlasca, an Italian businessman working at the Spanish embassy, and Friedrich Born, the Swiss delegate of the International Committee of the Red Cross, Lutz worked relentlessly for many months to prevent the planned deaths of innocent people. He and his colleagues dodged the actions of their German and Hungarian counterparts. Thanks to his diplomatic skills, Lutz succeeded in persuading Hungarian and Nazi German officials, among them Adolf Eichmann, to tolerate, at least in part, his formal protection of Hungarian Jews. Lutz's efforts to undermine the Nazi genocide were so bold and so extensive that, in November 1944, Proconsul Edmund Veesenmayer, the German representative in Hungary, asked permission to assassinate the Swiss Consul; Berlin never answered.

The Swiss Minister, Maximilian Jaeger, supported Lutz until his departure at his government's orders as the Soviet Army approached in late 1944. In the last weeks before the Red Army took the city, Lutz was helped by Harald Feller, who took over responsibility of the Swiss legation after Jaeger's departure. Lutz's wife Gertrud ('Trudi') notably played a central supporting role during the whole period of her husband's activities in Budapest.

=== After the Second World War ===
From 1945 to 1954 he was stationed in Berne and Zurich, Section for Foreign Interests of the Federal Political Department, and from 1952 to 1961 he was Consul General in Bregenz, Austria. He retired in 1961.

== Personal life ==
In 1935, Lutz married his first wife, Gertrud Fankhauser (1911–1995), who was a fellow employee at the Swiss consulate in St. Louis, Missouri. They did not have children and divorced in 1946.

In 1949, he married secondly to Hungarian-born Maria Magdalena "Magda" Csányi Grausz (née Csányi), who during the war had asked him to protect her and her daughter. He ultimately adopted her daughter:

- Agnes Grausz (born 1938), married Eric Hirschi, with issue. Her biological father was Alexander Grausz (né Grausz Sándor), a Hungarian businessman, who was an assimilated Anglican living in England.

Lutz died in Bern, Switzerland, in 1975, aged 79.

== Legacy and honours ==
Lutz saved the lives of tens of thousands of people. As in the case of Paul Grüninger, however, his achievements were not immediately recognized in Switzerland. Soon after the war, he was first criticized by the Swiss government for having exceeded his authority, as officials were fearful of endangering Switzerland's neutral status. Many years later, in 1958, as part of Swiss national rethinking of the war years, Lutz was "rehabilitated" in terms of public reputation, and his achievements were honored.

- 1963, a street in Haifa, Israel, was named after him, which runs from the railway station to the northernmost point of the Bat Galim neighborhood.
- a modest one block dead-end street in Jerusalem's Neve Yaakov neighborhood is named after Carl Lutz.
- 1965, Lutz was the first Swiss national named to the list of "Righteous Among the Nations" by Yad Vashem, Israel's memorial to the Holocaust.
- Lutz was decorated with the Cross of Honor, Order of Merit of the Federal Republic of Germany.
- 1991, a memorial dedicated to him was erected at the entrance to the old Budapest ghetto (see photo above).
- 1998, Lutz appeared on an Israeli postage stamp along with four other "Righteous Among the Nations".
- 2014, George Washington University in Washington, D.C., posthumously honored Lutz with the President's Medal in a ceremony attended by various international dignitaries and his step-daughter Agnes Hirschi.
- His name has been included in The Raoul Wallenberg-memorial at the Dohány Street Synagogue in Budapest (see photo above).
- In 2017, a scenic lookout built in his memory was dedicated in Switzerland Forest, near Tiberias, the Sea of Galilee, and the Golan Heights.
- In 2018, a meeting room in the West Wing of the Federal Palace of Switzerland in Bern, Switzerland, was renamed the Carl Lutz room.
- The Carl Lutz Society promotes his legacy.

== Statements and songs ==
- Statement by Rabbi Dr Norman Lamm. Beacons in the Dark
- Statement by Professor MP Irv Cotler. Beacons in the Dark
- The Rescuers song by David Ben TReuven
- Carl Lutz: the Glass House Rescuer song by David Ben Reuven

== See also ==
- Walking with the Enemy
- Shoes on the Danube Bank
- Ambassador Carl Lutz and Franz Brozincevic Wetzikon FBW-bus - Wikipedia Swiss PTT Passenger FBW/Saurer car before the Embassy in Budapest with Ambassador Carl Lutz to the right. The bus is equipped with wood gasifier, special diplomatic licence plates and special "dark" lights (e.g. following the Verdunkelungs-V. vom 23 May 1939 (Deutsches Reich)).

== Bibliography ==
- (in French) Luca Bernardi, "Le diplomate courage" (subtitle: "Carl Lutz, vice-consul de Suisse à Budapest entre 1942 et 1945, a mis au point une stratégie ayant permis de sauver plus de 62 000 Juifs. Une exposition dans sa ville natale est consacrée à cet homme quasi oublié"), Le Temps, 4 September 2013, p. 28.

== Literature ==
- (in German and French) Theo Tschuy: Carl Lutz und die Juden von Budapest. NZZ Libro, Zürich 1999, ISBN 978-3858237538.
- (in German) Erika Rosenberg: Das Glashaus: Carl Lutz und die Rettung ungarischer Juden vor dem Holocaust. Herbig, München 2016, ISBN 978-3776627879.
