= Glass House (Budapest) =

Hungarian museum

Coordinates: 47.50569°N 19.05363°E

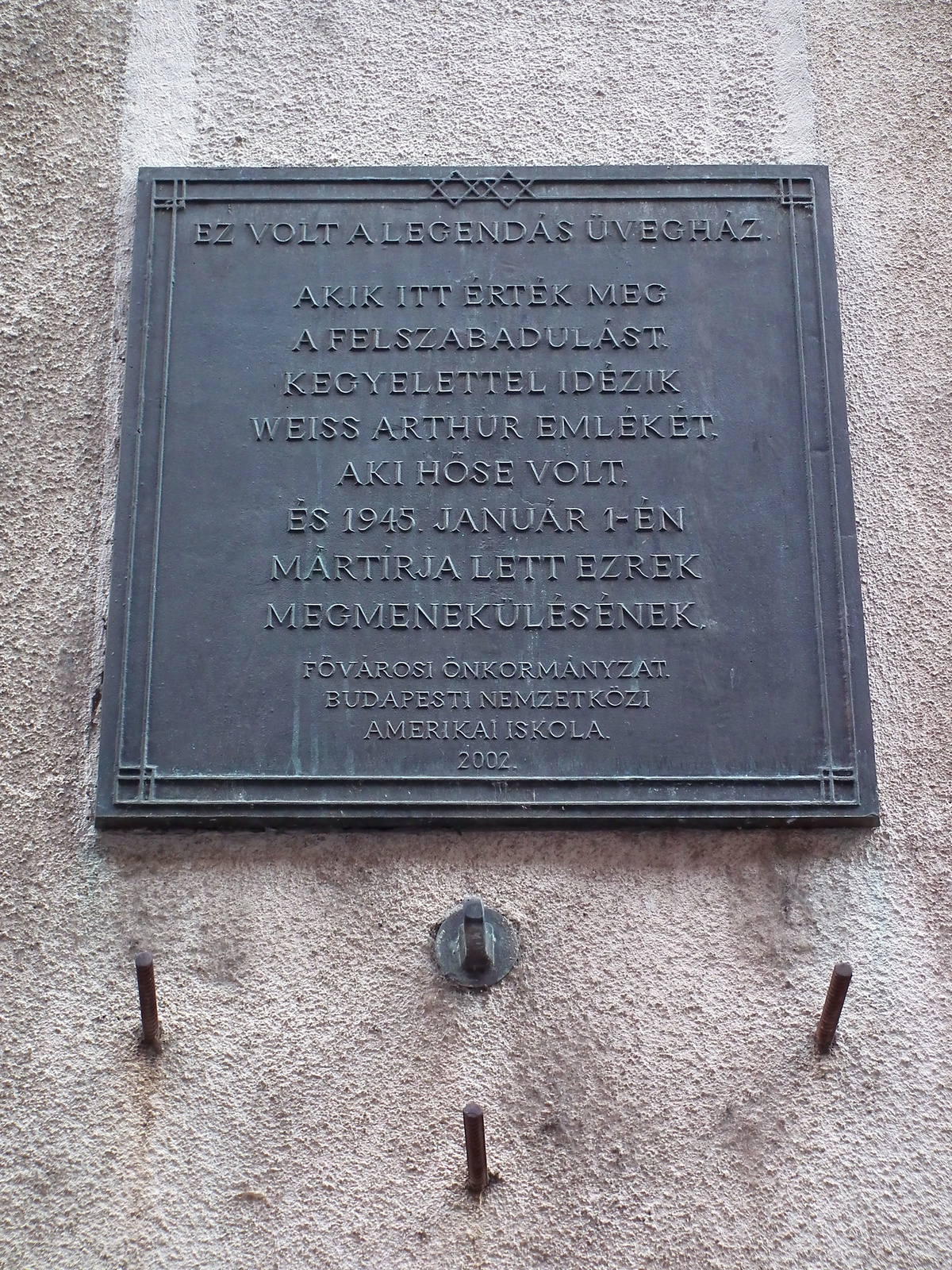
Memorial plaque at the site of the Glass House

The Glass House (Hungarian: Üvegház) was a building used by the Swiss diplomat Carl Lutz to help Jews in Budapest during the Holocaust.

== During the Holocaust ==
At one time, about 3,000 Jews found refuge at the Glass House and in a neighboring building from large numbers of Hungarian fascist, antisemitic murderers and the German Nazis. The Glass House also had a broader impact because it was used as a headquarters by the Jewish youth underground which saved many lives.

The building, that had once been a glass factory, is located at 29 Vadász Street, not far from the large and well known Saint Stephen's Basilica and Hungary's Parliament.

Carl Lutz is credited with saving the lives of 62,000 Jews from the Holocaust by issuing "letters of protection"—a life-saving diplomatic device. In addition, he helped 10,000 Jewish children emigrate to Israel after he became head of Switzerland's foreign interests section in Budapest in 1942. By 1944, Lutz represented 12 countries in addition to Switzerland, including the United States.

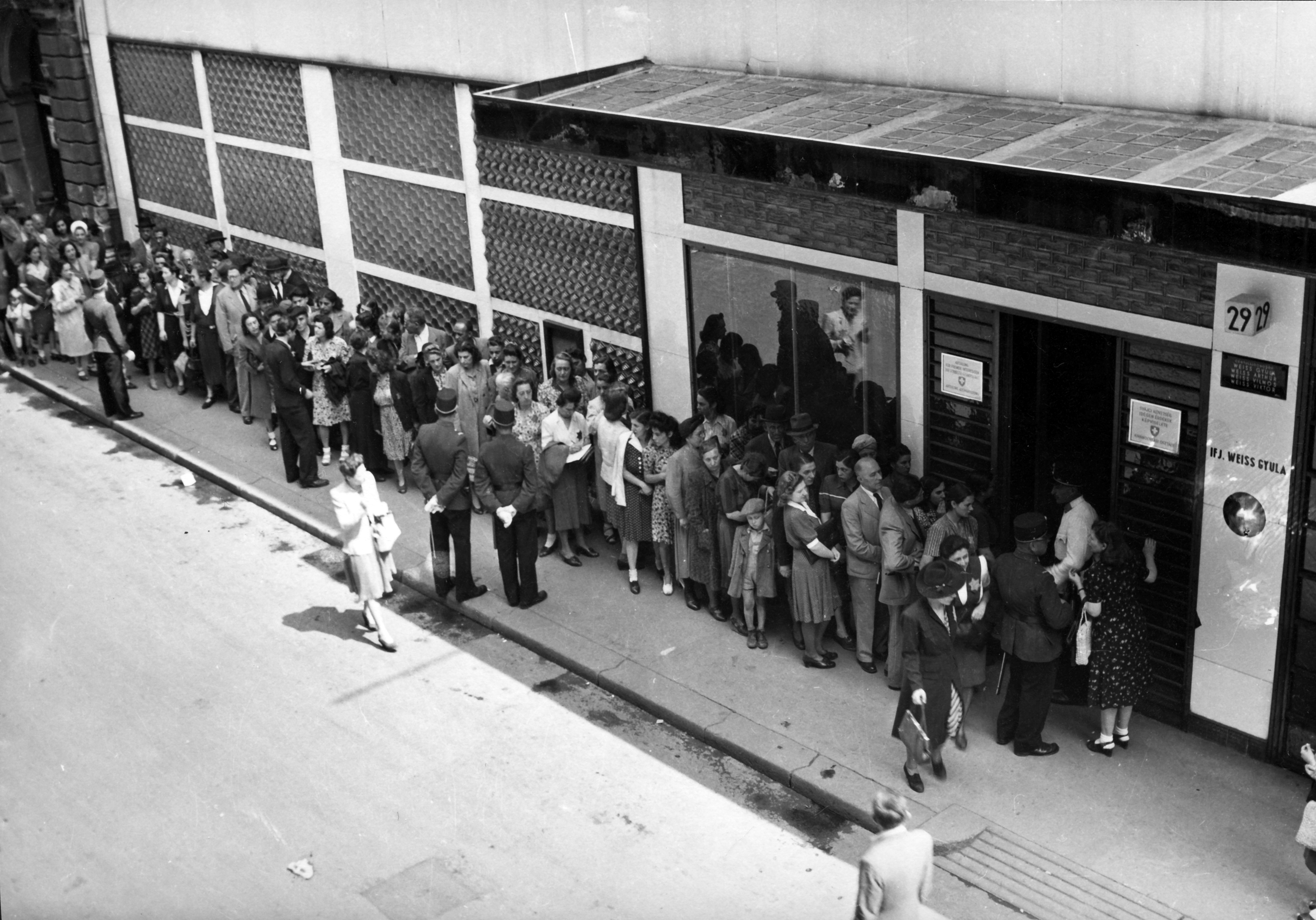
Jewish people waiting in line at the Glass House (Üvegház) in Budapest, 1944. This photograph was taken by Agnes Hirschi, Carl Lutz's daughter.

Born in Switzerland in 1895, Lutz emigrated at the age of 18 to the United States, where he was to remain for more than 20 years. Appointed in 1942 as Swiss vice-consul in Budapest, Hungary, Lutz soon began cooperating with the Jewish Agency for Israel, issuing Swiss safe-conduct documents enabling Jewish children to emigrate. Once the Nazis took over Budapest in 1944 and began deporting Jews to the death camps, Lutz negotiated a special deal with the Hungarian government and the Nazis: he had permission to issue protective letters to 8,000 Hungarian Jews for emigration to Palestine.

In partnership with Miklos "Moshe" Krausz, Lutz then deliberately misinterpreted his permission for 8,000 as applying to families rather than individuals, and proceeded to issue tens of thousands of additional protective letters, all of them bearing a number between one and 8,000. He also set up some 76 safe houses around Budapest, declaring them annexes of the Swiss legation. Among the safe houses the most famous one was the Glass House, where over 3,000 Jews found refuge and protection from their persecutors.

After the war, Lutz was initially reprimanded for having gone too far in his efforts, but was vindicated and honored by the Swiss government in 1957. He retired from the Swiss consular service in 1961.

For risking his life to help Jews during the Holocaust, Lutz in 1964 became the first Swiss national named "Righteous Among the Nations" by Yad Vashem, the Holocaust memorial authority in Israel.

Lutz died in Bern, Switzerland, in 1975.

== Commemoration ==
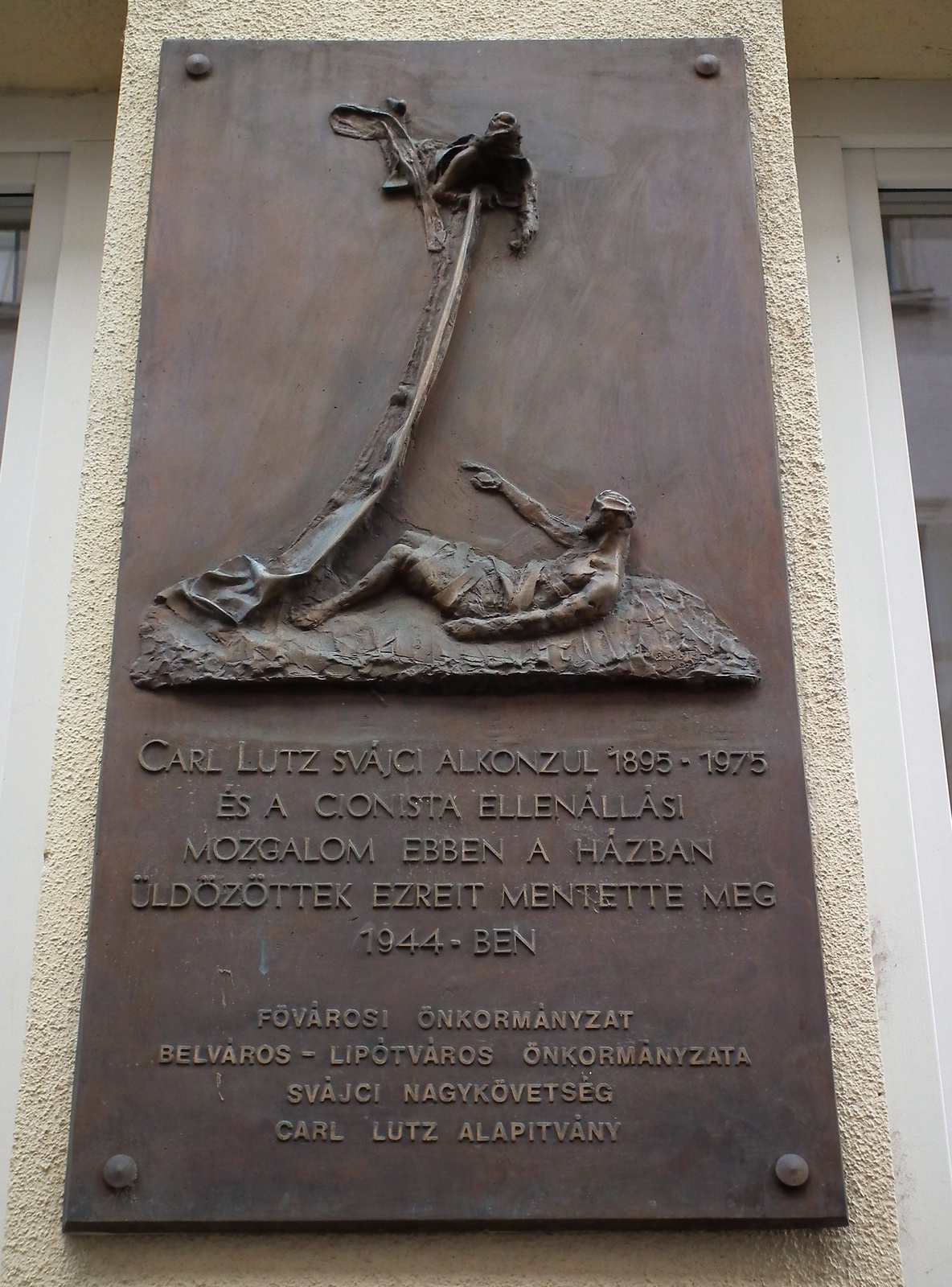
Memorial plaque for Carl Lutz

The Glass House is now open for visitors as a museum that documents the history of Carl Lutz and his activities. At the entrance to the old Budapest ghetto, a wall-monument was erected to him in 1991. Although more than 400,000 Hungarian Jews were murdered in the Holocaust, 125,000 survived, half of them thanks to the efforts of Carl Lutz.
