= Harald Feller =

Swiss diplomat (1913–2003)

Harald Feller (1913–2003) was a Swiss diplomat who saved Hungarian Jews during the Holocaust, for which he was honored by Yad Vashem as one of the Righteous Among the Nations in 1999.

== See also ==
- Raoul Wallenberg
