= Will Grands =

Dutch record producer, singer and songwriter

Grands
- Also known as: Van Dalen
- Born: Bas van Daalen; 25 April 1996 (age 29)
- Origin: Waalwijk, North Brabant, Netherlands
- Genres: Dance, house, electro house
- Occupations: Disc Jockey, record producer, singer

Bas van Daalen (born April 25, 1996 in Waalwijk, the Netherlands), known professionally by his stagename Will Grands, is a Dutch DJ, record producer, singer and songwriter.

== Biography ==
Van Daalen grew up in a small city Waalwijk in the Netherlands. His parents (Hennie van Daalen and Marina van Daalen) sent him to a music school to improve his musical development to take keyboard/piano lesson at music school "De Terp". At that age he learned to play guitar and piano. After 7 years he started to create music in a different way after he installed the demo of Fruity Loops

Bas was studying for audio/visual production on Sint-Lucas in Eindhoven. He quit school at the age of 18 to fully commit to his musical work.

== Career ==
At an early age he started to create EDM (electronic dance music). At the age of 16 Van Daalen renamed himself to "Van Dalen" and started to (co)-produce, compose and write for established artists. He connected with other DJ's and producers and got picked up by Artist Manager Robbert Winnemuller and Jasper Helderman (better known as Dj alvaro. In 2014 they produced an electronic house song called "Oldskool". The track peaked at number 3 on the Beatport Electro House chart. After that he wrote, co-produced and sung "Watching You". He is known for being multi-instrumental, a songwriter and singer.

In 2019 he co-produced songs for Major Lazer, Rudimental, Anne-Marie, Diplo, Ellie Goulding, Swae Lee, Jidenna, Kriss Kross Amsterdam and The Boy Next Door. The track "Let Me Live" by Rudimental and Major Lazer peaked at number 7 in the UK Dance Chart. After "Let Me Live", he co-produces the new single of Ellie Goulding and Diplo Close To Me. It was premiered by Annie Mac on BBC Radio 1 as the "Hottest Record in the World". In November 2018 he received 2 platinum records for the song" Whenever" by Kriss Kross Amsterdam and The Boy Next Door he co-produced. The song was on the radio 538 top-40 for over 20 weeks and peaked on number 4. Let me Live, Whenever and Close To Me reached far into the Global Spotify top 50 playlist.

His work on Major Lazer their 5th studio album called "Music Is The Weapon (Reloaded)" and J Balvin his album "Jose" led to his first work that got nominated for a grammy in 2021 in categories "Best dance/electronic album" and "Best Música Urbana album".

== Releases ==
Name	Artist	Release date
Watching You	Faustix & Alvaro	March 3, 2017
What If We	Will Grands	March 27, 2017
Hold You Down	Will Grands	July 26, 2017
At Home	Will Grands	September 15, 2017
More Than A Woman	Will Grands	October 27, 2017
Boomerang	Jidenna	November 10, 2017
Put Me Away	Will Grands	February 2, 2018
Control ft. Rochelle	OIJ	May 19, 2018
Let Me Live with Rudimental x Anne-Marie x Mr Eazi	Major Lazer	June 15, 2018
Whenever ft. Conor Maynard	Kris Kross Amsterdam	June 22, 2018
On My Way ft. Stevie Appleton	Malifoo	July 14, 2018
Heart Stops Beating	Malifoo	September 14, 2018
Close To Me	Ellie Goulding X Diplo & Swae Lee	October 24, 2018
Vamanos	Kris Kross Amsterdam	November 23, 2018
Hij is van mij ft. Maan & Tabitha & Bizzey	Kris Kross Amsterdam	December 21, 2018
Selfish	Dimitri Vegas & Like Mike & Era Istrefi	January 15, 2019
Can't Take It From Me (feat. Skip Marley)	Major Lazer	May 10, 2019
Stay (Don't Go Away)	David Guetta feat Raye	May 10, 2019
Moment	Kris Kross Amsterdam, Kraantje Pappie & Tabitha	May 17, 2019
Ik Sta Jou Beter	Kris Kross Amsterdam, Nielson	July 28, 2019
Ooh Girl (fest A Boogie Wit Da Hoodie)	Kris Kross Amsterdam, Conor Maynard	July 27, 2019
Lippenstift	Marco Borsato, Snelle, John Ewbank	September 27, 2019
Meloday (feat. James Francis)	The Boy Next Door, Rino Sambo	October 18, 2019
Trigger	Major Lazer & Khalid	October 24, 2019
Together	Malifoo	October 25, 2019
Evapora	IZA, Ciara, Major Lazer	November 11, 2019
So Tell Me	Malifoo	January 4, 2020
Loop Niet Weg ft. Tino Martin & Emma Heesters	Kris Kross Amsterdam	February 7, 2020
Rosa	JBalvin	March 20, 2020
Lay Your Head On Me (feat. Marcus Mumfort)	Major Lazer	March 26, 2020
Blinding Lights (Major Lazer Remix)	The Weeknd	April 15, 2020
Dance With ME	Diplo, Thomas Rhett & Young Thug	May 5, 2020
Mij Niet Eens Gezien	Kris Kross Amsterdam	July 24, 2020
QueloQue	Major Lazer & Paloma Mami	October 16, 2020
Donderdag	Kriss Kross Amsterdam, Emma Heesters & Bilal Wahib	October 22, 2020
Tiny	Major Lazer, Beam & Diplo	October 23, 2020
Hell & High Water	Major Lazer & Alessia Cara	October 23, 2020
Hands up (feat Moonchild Sanelly & Morena Leraba)	Major Lazer	March 24, 2021
Get Together	David Guetta	May 7, 2021
Hef Je Glas	Marco Borsato & Rolf Sanchez	May 16, 2021
Only Us	Sera	July 16, 2021
Increíble	Rolf Sanchez & Kris Kross Amsterdam	August 13, 2021
40/40	Lil Yachty	August 23, 2021
You Can Call Me Al	Zikai Kris Kross Amsterdam	August 30, 2021
Si Te Atreves	J Balvin, Zion & Lennox	September 10, 2021
Take A Chance	Sera	November 23, 2021
Humble	Diplo & Lil Yachty	March 4, 2022
Don’t Forget My Love	Diplo & Miguel	March 4, 2022
Savage	Tiësto & Deorro	April 29, 2022
