= Lil Tjay discography =

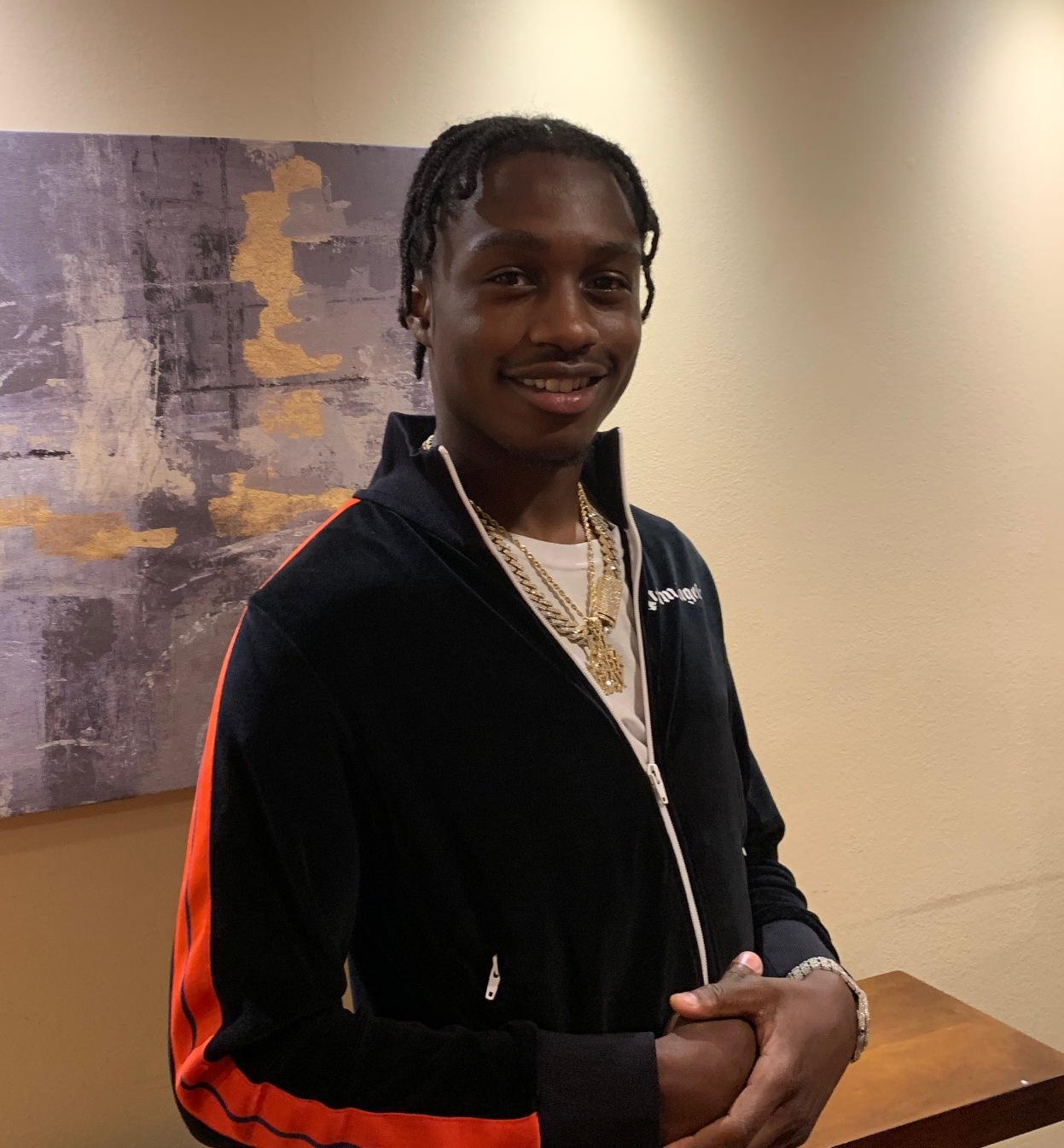
- Tjay in 2019
- Studio albums: 4
- Singles: 68
- Music videos: 79
- Extended plays: 4

American rapper Lil Tjay has released four studio albums, four extended plays and 68 singles (including twenty eight as a featured artist).

== Albums ==
=== Studio albums ===
| Title | Album details | Peak chart positions | | | | | | | Certifications |
| Title | Album details | US | AUS | BEL (FL) | CAN | IRE | NLD | UK | Certifications |
|---|---|---|---|---|---|---|---|---|---|
| True 2 Myself | Released: October 11, 2019; Label: Columbia; Format: Digital download, streaming | 5 | 59 | 180 | 2 | 57 | 40 | 22 | RIAA: 2× Platinum; BPI: Gold; MC: Gold |
| Destined 2 Win | Released: April 2, 2021.; Label: Columbia.; Format: Digital download, streaming. | 5 | 9 | 19 | 2 | 14 | 6 | 7 | RIAA: Platinum; BPI: Gold |
| 222 | Released: July 14, 2023.; Label: Columbia.; Format: Digital download, streaming. | 24 | 41 | 47 | 15 | 38 | 35 | 26 | |
| They Just Ain't You | Released: May 1, 2026.; Label: TrenchKid Records.; Format: Digital download, streaming. | — | — | — | — | — | — | — | |

== Extended plays ==
| Title | EP details | Peak chart positions | | | Certifications |
| Title | EP details | US | CAN | UK | Certifications |
|---|---|---|---|---|---|
| No Comparison | Released: December 24, 2018; Label: Columbia; Format: Digital download, streaming | — | — | — | |
| F.N | Released: August 9, 2019; Label: Columbia; Format: Digital download, streaming | 38 | 35 | 80 | BPI: Gold |
| State of Emergency | Released: May 8, 2020; Label: Columbia; Format: Digital download, streaming | 31 | 19 | 60 | |
| Farewell | Released: December 6, 2024; Label: Columbia; Format: Digital download, streaming | — | — | — | |

== Singles ==
=== As lead artist ===
| Title | Year | Peak chart positions | | | | | | | | | | Certifications | Album |
| Title | Year | US | US R&B/HH | AUS | CAN | IRE | NZ | POR | SWE | UK | WW | Certifications | Album |
|---|---|---|---|---|---|---|---|---|---|---|---|---|---|
| "Resume" | 2018 | — | — | — | — | — | — | — | — | — | — | RIAA: Gold | Non-album singles |
| "Ride for You" | 2018 | — | — | — | — | — | — | — | — | — | — | | Non-album singles |
| "Long Time" | 2018 | — | — | — | — | — | — | — | — | — | — | RIAA: Gold | Non-album singles |
| "Brothers" | 2018 | — (Note: "Brothers" did not chart on the Hot 100, but did peak at number 14 on the Bubbling Under Hot 100 chart.) | — (Note: "Brothers" did not chart on the Hot R&B/Hip-Hop Songs chart, but peaked at number seven on the Bubbling Under R&B/Hip-Hop Singles chart.) | — | 99 | — | — | — | — | — | — | RIAA: 3× Platinum; BPI: Silver; MC: Platinum; RMNZ: Gold | F.N and True 2 Myself |
| "Leaked" | 2018 | — (Note: "Leaked" did not chart on the Hot 100, but did peak at number 19 on the Bubbling Under Hot 100 chart.) | — | — | 97 | — | — | — | — | — | — | RIAA: 2× Platinum; BPI: Gold; MC: Gold; RMNZ: Platinum | F.N and True 2 Myself |
| "Goat" | 2018 | — | — | — | — | — | — | — | — | — | — | RIAA: Platinum; MC: Gold | F.N and True 2 Myself |
| "Pa$to" | 2019 | — | — | — | — | — | — | — | — | — | — | | Non-album single |
| "Ruthless" (featuring Jay Critch) | 2019 | — | — | — | — | — | — | — | — | — | — | RIAA: Platinum; BPI: Silver; MC: Gold | F.N and True 2 Myself |
| "Laneswitch" | 2019 | — | — | — | — | — | — | — | — | — | — | RIAA: Gold | F.N and True 2 Myself |
| "F.N" (solo or remix featuring DigDat) | 2019 | 56 | 23 | — | 39 | 73 | — | — | — | 69 | — | RIAA: 6× Platinum; BPI: Platinum; MC: 2× Platinum; IFPI DEN: Platinum; SNEP: Gold; FIMI: Gold; RMNZ: 2× Platinum; AFP: Platinum; IFPI GR: Gold | F.N and True 2 Myself |
| "Hold On" | 2019 | — (Note: "Hold On" did not chart on the Hot 100, but did peak at number seven on the Bubbling Under Hot 100 chart.) | — (Note: "Hold On" did not chart on the Hot R&B/Hip-Hop Songs chart, but did peak at number three on the Bubbling Under R&B/Hip-Hop Singles chart.) | — | 75 | — | — | — | — | — | — | RIAA: Platinum; BPI: Silver; MC: Gold; RMNZ: Gold | True 2 Myself |
| "Go In" | 2019 | — (Note: "Go In" did not chart on the Hot 100, but did peak at number nine on the Bubbling Under Hot 100 chart.) | 50 | — | 85 | — | — | — | — | — | — | RIAA: Gold | Non-album singles |
| "20/20" | 2020 | 94 | 44 | — | 64 | — | — (Note: "20/20" did not enter the NZ Top 40 Singles Chart, but peaked at number 24 on the NZ Hot Singles Chart.) | — | — | — | — | RIAA: Platinum | Non-album singles |
| "First Place" (with Polo G) | 2020 | — | — | — | — | — | — | — | — | — | — | | Non-album singles |
| "Ice Cold" | 2020 | — | — | — | — | — | — | — | — | — | — | | State of Emergency |
| "Losses" | 2020 | — (Note: "Losses" did not chart on the Hot 100, but did peak at number six on the Bubbling Under Hot 100 chart.) | 45 | — | 74 | — | — (Note: "Losses" did not enter the NZ Top 40 Singles Chart, but peaked at number 20 on the NZ Hot Singles Chart.) | — | — | 84 | — | | Destined 2 Win |
| "Move On" | 2020 | — (Note: "Move On" did not chart on the Hot 100, but did peak at number 25 on the Bubbling Under Hot 100 chart.) | — | — | 77 | — | — (Note: "Move On" did not enter the NZ Top 40 Singles Chart, but peaked at number 19 on the NZ Hot Singles Chart.) | — | — | 65 | — | RIAA: Gold | Destined 2 Win |
| "None of Your Love" | 2020 | — | — | — | — | — | — (Note: "None of Your Love" did not enter the NZ Top 40 Singles Chart, but peaked at number 29 on the NZ Hot Singles Chart.) | — | — | — | — | | Destined 2 Win |
| "Calling My Phone" (with 6lack) | 2021 | 3 | 1 | 3 | 1 | 2 | 2 | 6 | 14 | 2 | 2 | RIAA: 4× Platinum; ARIA: Platinum; BPI: Platinum; MC: Gold; IFPI DEN: Platinum; SNEP: Gold; FIMI: Gold; RMNZ: Gold; AFP: Platinum; GLF: Gold | Destined 2 Win |
| "Headshot" (with Polo G and Fivio Foreign) | 2021 | 42 | 21 | 70 | 16 | 39 | — (Note: "Headshot" did not enter the NZ Top 40 Singles Chart, but peaked at number seven on the NZ Hot Singles Chart.) | 191 | — (Note: "Headshot" did not enter the Swedish Singellista Chart, but peaked at number five on the Swedish Heatseeker Chart.) | 40 | — | RIAA: 2× Platinum; MC: Gold; RMNZ: Gold | Destined 2 Win |
| "Born 2 Be Great" | 2021 | — (Note: "Born 2 Be Great" did not chart on the Hot 100, but did peak at number eight on the Bubbling Under Hot 100 chart.) | — | — | — | — | — (Note: "Born 2 Be Great" did not enter the NZ Top 40 Singles Chart, but peaked at number 35 on the NZ Hot Singles Chart.) | — | — | — | — | | Destined 2 Win |
| "Dreams Unfold" (with Joyner Lucas) | 2021 | — | — | — | — | — | — | — | — | — | — | | Non-album singles |
| "Not in the Mood" (featuring Fivio Foreign and Kay Flock) | 2021 | 61 | 22 | — | 35 | 98 | — (Note: "Not in the Mood" did not enter the NZ Top 40 Singles Chart, but peaked at number nine on the NZ Hot Singles Chart.) | — | — | 75 | 92 | | Non-album singles |
| "In My Head" | 2022 | 33 | 8 | 27 | 14 | 27 | — (Note: "In My Head" did not enter the NZ Top 40 Singles Chart, but peaked at number three on the NZ Hot Singles Chart.) | 95 | 49 | 18 | 25 | RIAA: Gold; BPI: Silver; MC: Gold; RMNZ: Gold | Non-album singles |
| "Goin Up" | 2022 | — | — | — | 81 | — | — (Note: "Goin Up" did not enter the NZ Top 40 Singles Chart, but peaked at number 18 on the NZ Hot Singles Chart.) | — | — | — | — | | Non-album singles |
| "Beat the Odds" (Note: A remix of "Beat the Odds" was released as part of Lil Tjay's third studio album 222, titled "Beat the Odds Pt 2" featuring Polo G.) | 2022 | 36 | 12 | 72 | 27 | 80 | — (Note: "Beat the Odds" did not enter the NZ Top 40 Singles Chart, but peaked at number four on the NZ Hot Singles Chart.) | — | — (Note: "Beat the Odds" did not enter the Swedish Singellista Chart, but peaked at number one on the Swedish Heatseeker Chart.) | 41 | 64 | | Non-album singles |
| "Give You What You Want" | 2022 | — | — | — | 100 | — | — (Note: "Give You What You Want" did not enter the NZ Top 40 Singles Chart, but peaked at number eight on the NZ Hot Singles Chart.) | — | — | — | — | | Non-album singles |
| "June 22nd" | 2023 | — | — | — | — | — | — (Note: "June 22nd" did not enter the NZ Top 40 Singles Chart, but peaked at number 24 on the NZ Hot Singles Chart.) | — | — | — | — | | 222 |
| "Project Walls" (featuring YoungBoy Never Broke Again) | 2023 | — (Note: "Project Walls" did not chart on the Hot 100, but did peak at number nine on the Bubbling Under Hot 100 chart.) | 32 | — | — | — | — (Note: "Project Walls" did not enter the NZ Top 40 Singles Chart, but peaked at number 12 on the NZ Hot Singles Chart.) | — | — | — | — | | 222 |
| "I Should've Known" (featuring Kyle Richh) | 2023 | — | — | — | — | — | — | — | — | — | — | | Non-album single |
| "Told Ya" | 2024 | — | — | — | — | — | — (Note: "Told Ya" did not enter the NZ Top 40 Singles Chart, but peaked at number 24 on the NZ Hot Singles Chart.) | — | — | — | — | | Farewell |
| "No No" | 2024 | — | — | — | — | — | — | — | — | — | — | | Non-album singles |
| "Took A While (Be Us)" | 2024 | — | — | — | — | — | — | — | — | — | — | | Non-album singles |
| "Step Up" (with Yailin La Más Viral) | 2024 | — | — | — | — | — | — | — | — | — | — | | Non-album singles |
| "Way Out The Hood" | 2024 | — | — | — | — | — | — | — | — | — | — | | Non-album singles |
| "Legacy" | 2024 | — | — | — | — | — | — | — | — | — | — | | Non-album singles |
| "Still Love You" | 2024 | — | — | — | — | — | — | — | — | — | — | | Non-album singles |
| "Let It Go Baby" | 2024 | — | — | — | — | — | — | — | — | — | — | | Farewell |
| "Way Out the Hood II" (with Polo G) | 2024 | — | — | — | — | — | — | — | — | — | — | | Non-album singles |
| "Apex" | 2025 | — | — | — | — | — | — (Note: "Apex" did not enter the NZ Top 40 Singles Chart, but peaked at number 35 on the NZ Hot Singles Chart.) | — | — | — | — | | Non-album singles |
| "Wrongs" (with D-Block Europe) | 2025 | — | — | — | — | — | — | — | — | 51 | — | | PTSD 2 |
"—" denotes a recording that did not chart or was not released in that territory.

=== As featured artist ===
| Title | Year | Peak chart positions | | | | | | | Certifications | Album |
| Title | Year | US | AUS | CAN | DEN | NZ Hot | SWE | UK | Certifications | Album |
|---|---|---|---|---|---|---|---|---|---|---|
| "Pop Out" (Polo G featuring Lil Tjay) | 2019 | 11 | 82 | 12 | 36 | — | 87 | 41 | RIAA: 9× Platinum; ARIA: Gold; BPI: Platinum; IFPI DEN: Platinum; MC: 6× Platinum; RMNZ: 2× Platinum | Die a Legend |
| "Like This" (Sky Katz featuring Lil Tjay) | 2019 | — | — | — | — | — | — | — | | Non-album singles |
| "Your Love" (Drama Relax featuring Tory Lanez and Lil Tjay) | 2019 | — | — | — | — | — | — | — | | Non-album singles |
| "Slide" (French Montana featuring Blueface and Lil Tjay) | 2019 | 90 | — | 54 | — | 13 | — | 81 | RIAA: Gold; MC: Gold | Montana |
| "Pray for Me" (Izay featuring Lil Tjay) | 2019 | — | — | — | — | — | — | — | | Non-album singles |
| "Lying" (PrettyMuch featuring Lil Tjay) | 2019 | — | — | — | — | 19 | — | — | | Non-album singles |
| "War" (Pop Smoke featuring Lil Tjay) | 2019 | — | — | 100 | — | — | — | — | BPI: Silver | Meet the Woo 2 |
| "All Star" (Lil Tecca featuring Lil Tjay) | 2020 | — (Note: "All Star" did not chart on the Hot 100, but did peak at number 18 on the Bubbling Under Hot 100 chart.) | — | — | — | 39 | — | — | | Non-album singles |
| "Only the Team" (Rvssian featuring Lil Tjay and Lil Mosey) | 2020 | — | — | — | — | — | — | — | | Non-album singles |
| "Fade Away" (The Kid Laroi featuring Lil Tjay) | 2020 | — | 73 | — | — | 5 | — | — | RIAA: Gold | Non-album singles |
| "Hood Scars 2" (J.I the Prince of N.Y featuring Lil Tjay) | 2020 | — | — | — | — | — | — | — | | Non-album singles |
| "Mood Swings" (Pop Smoke featuring Lil Tjay) | 2020 | 17 | 5 | 14 | — | 4 | 11 | 5 | RIAA: 3× Platinum; ARIA: 2× Platinum; BPI: 2× Platinum; GLF: Platinum; IFPI DEN: Platinum; MC: Gold; RMNZ: 2× Platinum | Shoot for the Stars, Aim for the Moon |
| "The Jackie" (Bas and J. Cole featuring Lil Tjay) | 2021 | 78 | — | 60 | — | 7 | — | 100 | | Non-album single |
| "Best Friends 4L" (YNW Melly featuring Lil Tjay) | 2021 | — | — | — | — | — | — | — | | Just a Matter of Slime |
| "In Too Deep" (Rasandra featuring Lil Tjay) | 2021 | — | — | — | — | — | — | — | | Non-album single |
| "Doctor" (Hotboii featuring Lil Tjay) | 2021 | — | — | — | — | — | — | — | | Life of a Hotboii |
| "Elegance" (Nafe Smallz featuring Lil Tjay) | 2022 | — | — | — | — | — | — | 73 | | Legacy |
| "24hrs" (Kaash Paige featuring Lil Tjay) | 2022 | — | — | — | — | — | — | — | | S2ML |
| "Eastside (Remix)" (North Ave Jax featuring Lil Tjay) | 2022 | — | — | — | — | — | — | — | | Lazy, But I have Goals (Banned From Vermont) |
| "Do You Love Me?" (Rich The Kid featuring Lil Tjay) | 2023 | — | — | — | — | — | — | — | | Non-album singles |
| "High Price" (Morray featuring Lil Tjay) | 2023 | — | — | — | — | — | — | — | | Non-album singles |
| "Same Friends" (charlieonnafriday featuring Lil Tjay) | 2023 | — | — | — | — | — | — | — | | Wild Child |
| "Pain Talk" (Sleepy Hallow featuring Lil Tjay) | 2023 | — | — | — | — | 24 | — | — | | Boy Meets World |
| "Samolotowy tryb" (Malik Montana and Geenaro & Ghana Beats featuring Lil Tjay) | 2024 | — | — | — | — | — | — | — | | Non-album single |
| "Still On A Mission" (Albee Al featuring Lil Tjay) | 2024 | — | — | — | — | — | — | — | | Koba's Coming |
| "Fed Up" (Kay Flock featuring Lil Tjay) | 2024 | — | — | — | — | — | — | — | | Make America Flock Again |
| "Fall Back" (Lithe featuring Lil Tjay) | 2024 | — | — | — | — | — | — | — | | TBA |
| "Knowledge Is Power" (Finesse2tymes featuring Lil Tjay) | 2024 | — | — | — | — | — | — | — | | Art of War |
"—" denotes a recording that did not chart or was not released in that territory.

== Other charted and certified songs ==
| Title | Year | Peak chart positions | | | | | | Certifications | Album |
| Title | Year | US | US R&B/HH | CAN | IRE | NZ Hot | UK | Certifications | Album |
|---|---|---|---|---|---|---|---|---|---|
| "One Take" | 2019 | — (Note: "One Take" did not chart on the Hot 100, but did peak at number 12 on the Bubbling Under Hot 100 chart.) | — | 81 | — | — | — | RIAA: Platinum | True 2 Myself |
| "Decline" (featuring Lil Baby) | 2019 | — | — | — | — | — | — | RIAA: Gold | True 2 Myself |
| "Sex Sounds" | 2019 | — | — | — | — | — | — | RIAA: Platinum; BPI: Platinum | True 2 Myself |
| "Zoo York" (featuring Fivio Foreign and Pop Smoke) | 2020 | 65 | 28 | 38 | 91 | — | 65 | RIAA: Platinum | State of Emergency |
| "What You Wanna Do" | 2021 | — | — | — | — | 26 | — | | Destined 2 Win |
| "Run It Up" (featuring Offset and Moneybagg Yo) | 2021 | 50 | 26 | 26 | 76 | 8 | 63 | RIAA: Platinum; BPI: Silver | Destined 2 Win |
| "Cry No More" (G Herbo featuring Polo G and Lil Tjay) | 2021 | 81 | 29 | — | — | — | — | | 25 |
| "Genius" (with Pop Smoke and Swae Lee) | 2021 | — (Note: "Genius" did not enter the Billboard Hot 100, but peaked at number five on the Bubbling Under Hot 100 chart.) | 46 | 54 | — | — | — | | Faith |
| "Gangsta Boo" (with Ice Spice) | 2023 | 82 | 32 | — | — | 21 | — | | Like..? |
| "Stressed" (featuring Summer Walker) | 2023 | — | — | — | — | 21 | — | | 222 |
| "2 Grown" (featuring the Kid Laroi) | 2023 | — | — | — | — | 22 | — | | 222 |
| "Bla Bla" (featuring Fivio Foreign) | 2023 | — | — | — | — | 37 | — | | 222 |
"—" denotes a recording that did not chart or was not released in that territory.

== Guest appearances ==
List of non-single guest appearances, with other performing artists, showing year released and album name
| Title | Year | Other artist(s) | Album |
|---|---|---|---|
| "Street" | 2018 | Fatboy SSE | Boobie from the Block |
| "From Nothing" | 2019 | Jay Guawpo, Don Q | From Nothing Pt. 1 |
| "Touch the Stars" | 2019 | Yung Bans | Misunderstood |
| "In the Middle" | 2019 | Yung Bleu | Investments 6 |
| "Buss Down" | 2019 | Lil Zay Osama | Hood Bible |
| "Hot Sauce" | 2019 | YNW BSlime | Baby Goat |
| "Valentino (Remix)" | 2019 | 24kGoldn | Dropped Outta College |
| "Fake Love" | 2019 | Lil Durk | Family over Everything |
| "Mannequin" | 2020 | Pop Smoke | Meet the Woo 2 |
| "Depend on Me" | 2020 | Rich the Kid | Boss Man |
| "Barbarian" | 2020 | Calboy | Long Live the Kings |
| "Givenchy Kickin" | 2020 | Calboy, Lil Baby | Long Live the Kings |
| "Accidents Happen" | 2020 | Tory Lanez | The New Toronto 3 |
| "Hate on Me" | 2020 | YG | My Life 4Hunnid |
| "Wrong (Remix)" | 2020 | Luh Kel | L.O.V.E. |
| "Emotions" | 2021 | Lil Zay Osama | Trench Baby |
| "Richard Mille" | 2021 | Capo Plaza | Plaza |
| "It Is What It Is" | 2021 | Yxng K.A, J.I the Prince of N.Y | Reaper SZN (Delxue) |
| "Life Insurance" | 2021 | Tee Grizzley | Built for Whatever |
| "Genius" | 2021 | Pop Smoke, Swae Lee | Faith |
| "Take the Blame" | 2021 | Ar'mon & Trey | Trapped N Blues |
| "Soul Ties" | 2021 | Booka600 | Loyal |
| "Bag Season" | 2021 | French Montana | They Got Amnesia |
| "Suicide" | 2021 | Polo G | Hall of Fame 2.0 |
| "World Watching" | 2022 | Fivio Foreign, Yung Bleu | B.I.B.L.E. |
| "Hot Winter Freestyle" | 2022 | Gucci Mane | So Icy Boyz: The Finale |
| "Gangsta Boo" | 2023 | Ice Spice | Like..? |
| "Friends (Remix)" | 2023 | Eladio Carrión, Luar La L | 3men2 Kbrn |
| "Countin' On You" | 2023 | Fridayy, Khi Infinite | Fast X (Original Motion Picture Soundtrack) |
| "Trauma" | 2024 | Fivio Foreign | Pain & Love 2 |
| "2024" | 2024 | Rowdy Rebel, Fetty Luciano | Splash Brothers 2 |
| "Replay" | 2024 | Shiva | Milano Angels |
| "No Tears" | 2024 | Rich Homie Quan | Forever Goin In |
| "Babygirl" | 2025 | OhGeesy | Pain N Full |
| "Whodie" | 2025 | Tyga | NSFW |

== Music videos ==
| Year | Title | Release date | Director | Artist(s) |
As lead artist
| 2018 | "Resume" | January 26, 2018 | Tay Lite | —N/a |
| 2018 | "Long Time" | April 14, 2018 | Oliver Granville | —N/a |
| 2018 | "Brothers" | July 10, 2018 | Christian Royce | —N/a |
| 2018 | "New Flex" (Note: Not available on streaming platforms.) | August 9, 2018 | Spike Tarantino | Asian Doll |
| 2018 | "Slow Grind" (Note: Not available on streaming platforms.) | September 24, 2018 | Zachary Maxwell | —N/a |
| 2018 | "Forever" (Note: Not available on streaming platforms.) | October 31, 2018 | Spike Tarantino | —N/a |
| 2019 | "Bad To The Bone" (Note: Not available on streaming platforms.) | February 2, 2019 | LouieKnows | —N/a |
| 2019 | "Pa$to" | February 27, 2019 | Director Picasso | —N/a |
| 2019 | "Move Right" (Note: Not available on streaming platforms.) | March 14, 2019 | Herve Mompoint | —N/a |
| 2019 | "Ruthless" | May 30, 2019 | Himself | Jay Critch |
| 2019 | "Laneswitch" | July 16, 2019 | Upstate Groove | —N/a |
| 2019 | "F.N" | August 22, 2019 | David Wept | —N/a |
| 2019 | "Hold On" | October 15, 2019 | Unknown | —N/a |
| 2019 | "One Take" | November 27, 2019 | Unknown | —N/a |
| 2019 | "Leaked (Remix)" | December 20, 2019 | Unknown | Lil Wayne |
| 2020 | "20/20" | February 4, 2020 | DrewFilmedIt | —N/a |
| 2020 | "Sex Sounds" | April 8, 2020 | Gabe | —N/a |
| 2020 | "Ice Cold" | May 1, 2020 | David Wept | —N/a |
| 2020 | "Zoo York" | May 8, 2020 | JL Shot That | Fivio Foreign, Pop Smoke |
| 2020 | "Losses" | October 20, 2020 | Shomi Patwary | —N/a |
| 2020 | "Move On" | November 20, 2020 | David Karp & Courtney Loo | —N/a |
| 2020 | "Misunderstood" (Note: Not available on streaming platforms.) | December 10, 2020 | Unknown | —N/a |
| 2021 | "Calling My Phone" | February 12, 2021 | Cam Busby | 6lack |
| 2021 | "Headshot" | March 22, 2021 | Reel Goats | Polo G, Fivio Foreign |
| 2021 | "Run It Up" | April 2, 2021 | Whipalo | Offset, Moneybagg Yo |
| 2021 | "Oh Well" | April 4, 2021 | DrewFilmedIt | —N/a |
| 2021 | "Love Hurts" | April 7, 2021 | Unknown | Toosii |
| 2021 | "Gang Gang" | June 25, 2021 | JL Shot That | —N/a |
| 2021 | "Not In The Mood" | October 22, 2021 | JL Shot That | Fivio Foreign, Kay Flock |
| 2022 | "In My Head" | April 1, 2022 | Unknown | —N/a |
| 2022 | "Lavish (Freestyle)" (Note: Not available on streaming platforms.) | April 23, 2022 | Unknown | —N/a |
| 2022 | "Goin Up" | April 30, 2022 | JL Shot That | —N/a |
| 2022 | "Beat The Odds" | August 26, 2022 | Unknown | —N/a |
| 2022 | "Give You What You Want" | November 17, 2022 | Loris Russier | —N/a |
| 2023 | "Clutchin My Strap" (Note: Not available on streaming platforms.) | January 20, 2023 | JL Shot That | —N/a |
| 2023 | "June 22nd" | June 22, 2023 | Dell | —N/a |
| 2023 | "Stressed" | July 14, 2023 | David Wept | Summer Walker |
| 2023 | "Bla Bla" | July 27, 2023 | JL Shot That & TVK Visuals | Fivio Foreign |
| 2023 | "Nobody" | August 22, 2023 | Dell | —N/a |
| 2023 | "I Should've Known" | October 20, 2023 | Spike Tarantino | Kyle Richh |
| 2023 | "What You Wanna Do" | October 26, 2023 | Mooch | —N/a |
| 2023 | "Last Christmas" (Note: Not available on streaming platforms.) | December 18, 2023 | Grant Decyk & Nick Welch | Fivio Foreign |
| 2023 | "2 Grown" | December 25, 2023 | Jb tai | The Kid Laroi |
| 2024 | "Scared 2 Be Lonely" | January 1, 2024 | Jb tai | —N/a |
| 2024 | "Told Ya" | January 12, 2024 | Tai Market | —N/a |
| 2024 | "Good Life" | February 14, 2024 | Jb tai | —N/a |
| 2024 | "Let It Go Baby" | November 22, 2024 | Jb tai | —N/a |
| 2024 | "Way Out The Hood II" | December 6, 2024 | Jb tai | Polo G |
| 2024 | "Why" | December 11, 2024 | Jb tai | NLE Choppa |
As featured artist
| 2018 | "Street" | December 28, 2018 | BRGGS | Fatboy SSE |
| 2019 | "Pop Out" | January 13, 2019 | Ryan Lynch | Polo G |
| 2019 | "Like This" | February 13, 2019 | Spike Tarantino | Sky Katz |
| 2019 | "Slide" | April 18, 2019 | French Montana & Spiff TV | French Montana, Blueface |
| 2019 | "Pray For Me" | June 25, 2018 | Spike Tarantino | Izay |
| 2019 | "Lying" | July 19, 2019 | The Young Astronauts | PrettyMuch |
| 2019 | "War" | October 28, 2019 | JL Shot That | Pop Smoke |
| 2019 | "Hot Sauce" | December 6, 2019 | DrewFilmedIt | YNW BSlime |
| 2020 | "First Place" | January 17, 2020 | Ryan Lynch | Polo G |
| 2020 | "Barbarian" | February 13, 2020 | Ryan Lynch | Calboy |
| 2020 | "Only The Team" | March 27, 2020 | Unknown | Rvssian, Lil Mosey |
| 2020 | "Hood Scars 2" | June 19, 2020 | Unknown | J.I the Prince of N.Y |
| 2020 | "It Is What It Is" | September 25, 2020 | Whipalo | Yxng K.A, J.I the Prince of N.Y |
| 2020 | "Mood Swings" | October 7, 2020 | David Wept | Pop Smoke |
| 2021 | "Emotions" | May 18, 2021 | Unknown | Lil Zay Osama |
| 2021 | "Take The Blame" | May 22, 2021 | Unknown | Ar'mon & Trey |
| 2021 | "The Jackie" | July 9, 2021 | Unknown | Bas, J. Cole |
| 2021 | "Best Friends 4L" | August 6, 2021 | DrewFilmedIt | YNW Melly |
| 2021 | "In Too Deep" | October 8, 2021 | RingRing Visuals | Rasandra |
| 2021 | "Doctor" | November 5, 2021 | Jerry PHD | Hotboii |
| 2021 | "Bag Season" | November 24, 2021 | Unknown | French Montana |
| 2022 | "Elegance" | February 24, 2022 | Suave | Nafe Smallz |
| 2022 | "24hrs" | May 27, 2022 | Unknown | Kaash Paige |
| 2022 | "Eastside" | November 4, 2022 | itslovekelly | North Ave Jax |
| 2023 | "Do You Love Me?" | February 24, 2023 | Sebastian Beltran | Rich the Kid |
| 2023 | "High Price" | March 31, 2023 | Unknown | Morray |
| 2023 | "Same Friends" | March 31, 2023 | JakeTheShooter | Charlieonnafriday |
| 2023 | "Pain Talk" | May 24, 2023 | Picture Perfect | Sleepy Hallow |
| 2024 | "Trauma" | February 9, 2024 | Unknown | Fivio Foreign |
| 2024 | "Samolotowy tryb" | February 23, 2024 | JLShotthat | Malik Montana |
