= Fivio Foreign discography =

Drill recording artist discography

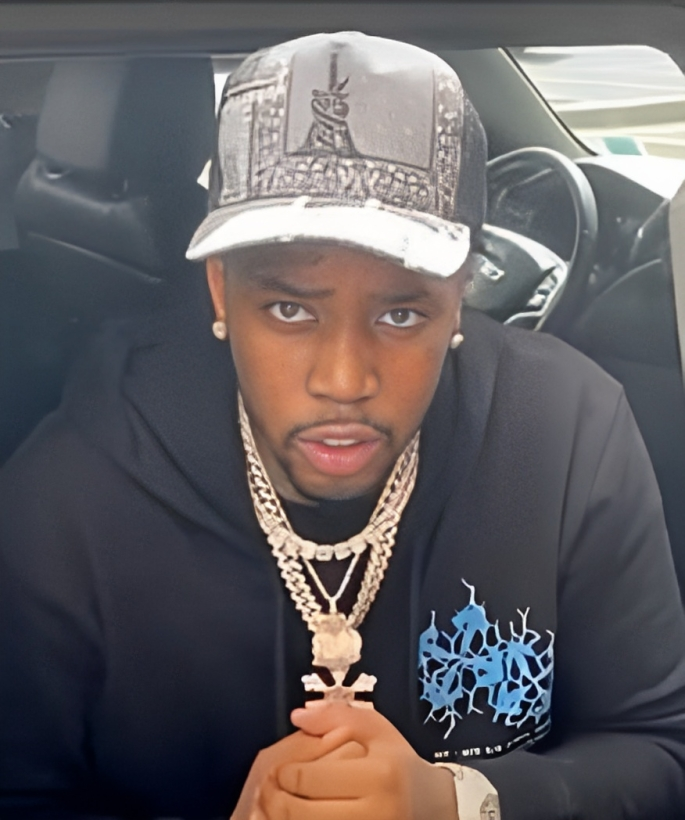
- Fivio Foreign in 2020
- Studio albums: 1
- EPs: 3
- Singles: 30

The discography American rapper Fivio Foreign consists of one studio album, three extended plays, one collaborative extended play and 30 singles (including 13 as a featured artist).

== Albums ==
Title	Album details	Peak chart positions					
Title	Album details	US	US R&B/HH	CAN	NLD	NZ	UK
B.I.B.L.E.	Released: April 8, 2022; Label: RichFish, Columbia; Format: Digital download, streaming	9	5	8	47	40	65

== Extended plays ==
Title	EP details	Peak chart positions	
Title	EP details	US	US Heat.
Pain and Love	Released: November 13, 2019; Label: RichFish, Columbia; Format: Digital download, streaming	—	23
800 B.C.	Released: April 24, 2020; Label: RichFish, Columbia; Format: Digital download, streaming	159	1
Without Warning	Released: May 31, 2023; Label: Foreign Slide Records, Columbia; Format: Digital download, streaming	—	—

=== Collaborative extended plays ===
Title	EP details
Grimey Demons (with Fetty Luciano)	Released: September 5, 2019; Label: Self-released; Format: Digital download

== Singles ==
=== As lead artist ===
List of singles as lead artist, with selected chart positions
Title	Year	Peak chart positions						Certifications	Album
Title	Year	US	US R&B/HH	US Rap	AUS	CAN	UK	Certifications	Album
"Big Drip" (solo or remix featuring Quavo and Lil Baby)	2019	—	—	—	—	—	—	RIAA: Platinum	Pain and Love and 800 B.C.
"Cool Em Off" (with P Gutta)	2019	—	—	—	—	—	—		Non-album singles
"Waka" (with Ether)	2019	—	—	—	—	—	—		Non-album singles
"Opps in the Air" (with Leaf Lzz)	2019	—	—	—	—	—	—		Non-album singles
"Gimme Dat" (with AXL Beats and OMB Jay Dee)	2019	—	—	—	—	—	—		Non-album singles
"Blixky Inna Box" (with Jay Dee and Dee Savv)	2019	—	—	—	—	—	—		Non-album singles
"Tete" (with AXL Beats and Drizzy Juliano)	2019	—	—	—	—	—	—		Non-album singles
"Treesha" (with Killa Cash)	2019	—	—	—	—	—	—		Non-album singles
"Locca"	2019	—	—	—	—	—	—		Non-album singles
"Critical" (with Fetty Luciano)	2019	—	—	—	—	—	—		Non-album singles
"Jumpin"	2019	—	—	—	—	—	—		Non-album singles
"Richer Than Ever" (with Rich the Kid)	2020	—	—	—	—	—	—		Non-album singles
"Spider-Man" (with Ron Suno)	2020	—	—	—	—	—	—		Swag Like Mike
"Wetty"	2020	—	—	—	—	—	—		800 B.C.
"Move Like a Boss" (featuring Young M.A)	2020	—	—	—	—	—	—		Non-album single
"13 Going on 30"	2020	—	—	—	—	—	—		Non-album single
"Demon Call" (featuring Keemo Bankz)	2020	—	—	—	—	—	—		Non-album single
"That's a Fact (Remix)" (with French Montana and Mr. Swipey)	2020	—	—	—	—	—	—		Non-album single
"Nili" (with Chucky73)	2020	—	—	—	—	—	—		Non-album single
"Franklin to the 9s" (with T.W.O)	2020	—	—	—	—	—	—		Non-album single
"Hottest Winter Ever" (with Gino Mondana)	2020	—	—	—	—	—	—		Non-album single
"Salute" (with Big Sean & Hit-Boy; original or alternative version)	2020	—	—	—	—	—	—		Madden NFL 22
"Bop It" (featuring Polo G)	2020	—	—	—	—	—	—		Non-album single
"Trust"	2020	—	—	—	—	—	—		Non-album single
"Baddie on My Wishlist"	2021	—	—	—	—	—	—		Carols Covered
"Headshot" (with Lil Tjay and Polo G)	2021	42	21	15	70	16	40	RIAA: 2× Platinum; MC: 2× Platinum; RMNZ: Gold	Destined 2 Win
"Atlanta"	2021	—	—	—	—	—	—		Non-album single
"Game Time" (with Funkmaster Flex)	2021	—	—	—	—	—	—		Non-album single
"Movie" (with Govana)	2021	—	—	—	—	—	—		Non-album single
"Unruly"	2021	—	—	—	—	—	—		Non-album single
"Goin Dummi"	2021	—	—	—	—	—	—		Non-album single
"Hello Baby" (with Young M.A)	2021	—	—	—	—	—	—		Non-album single
"Story Time"	2021	—	—	—	—	—	—		Non-album single
"24/7" (with Liam Tracy)	2021	—	—	—	—	—	—		Non-album single
"City of Gods" (with Kanye West and Alicia Keys) (Note: "City Of Gods" is also included on Kanye West's demo studio album Donda 2.)	2022	46	15	10	66	20	58	RIAA: Gold; MC: Gold	B.I.B.L.E.
"Magic City" (featuring Quavo)	2022	—	—	—	—	—	—		B.I.B.L.E.
"Top Notch" (with City Girls)	2022	— (Note: "Top Notch" did not enter the Billboard Hot 100, but peaked at number 21 on the Bubbling Under Hot 100 chart.)	—	—	—	—	—		Non-album singles
"Squeeze"	2022	—	—	—	—	—	—		Non-album singles
"Ouu Baby" (with BigBop)	2022	—	—	—	—	—	—		Non-album singles
"Brag" (with LAYA)	2022	—	—	—	—	—	—		Non-album singles
"Who We Are" (with Dime Da God)	2022	—	—	—	—	—	—		Non-album singles
"MVP" (with Faze Kaysan)	2022	—	—	—	—	—	—		Non-album singles
"Whap Whap" (with Skillibeng)	2022	—	—	—	—	—	—		Non-album singles
"Outside" (with Young Devyn)	2022	—	—	—	—	—	—		Non-album singles
"For Nothin"	2022	—	—	—	—	—	—		Non-album singles
"Slime Them"	2022	—	—	—	—	—	—		Non-album singles
"Hello"	2022	—	—	—	—	—	—		Non-album singles
"Amused" (with JNR Choi)	2022	—	—	—	—	—	—		Non-album singles
"Self Made"	2022	—	—	—	—	—	—		Non-album singles
"London Freestyle"	2022	—	—	—	—	—	—		Non-album singles
"God Did Freestyle"	2022	—	—	—	—	—	—		Non-album singles
"1 on 3" (with Rvssian)	2022	—	—	—	—	—	—		Non-album singles
"Paris to Tokyo" (with the Kid Laroi)	2022	— (Note: "Paris to Tokyo" did not enter the Billboard Hot 100, but peaked at number six on the Bubbling Under Hot 100 chart.)	35	23	26	53	—		B.I.B.L.E.
"Outcast" (with Malaa)	2022	—	—	—	—	—	—		Don Malaa.
"Against the World" (with DSturdy)	2023	—	—	—	—	—	—		Non-album singles
"My Head is Spinning like a Screw (Моя голова винтом)" (original or Lucky Luke remix with kostromin)	2023	—	—	—	—	—	—		Non-album singles
"Sicc and Tired"	2023	—	—	—	—	—	—		Non-album singles
"Hot Sauce"	2023	—	—	—	—	—	—		Non-album singles
"Still Movin" (with Rich the Kid and Jay Critch)	2023	—	—	—	—	—	—		Non-album singles
"Concussion" (with Kanye West)	2023	—	—	—	—	—	—		Non-album singles
"Bag on Em" (with Mini Boom)	2023	—	—	—	—	—	—		Non-album singles
"Posture" (with Rowdy Rebel and Fetty Luciano)	2023	—	—	—	—	—	—		Back Outside
"Till The Club Closes" (with Tiffany Haddish)	2023	—	—	—	—	—	—		Non-album singles
"Cha Cha Cha" (with Glorilla & CMG the Label)	2023	—	—	—	—	—	—		Non-album singles
"Why Would I?"	2023	—	—	—	—	—	—		Non-album singles
"Tequila Shots" (with Popcaan & Vybz Kartel)	2023	—	—	—	—	—	—		Non-album singles
"Teach Me How to Drill" (with Lil Mabu)	2023	—	—	—	—	—	—		Young Genius
"Rack It Up" (with Tata Taktumi)	—	—	—	—	—	—		TBA	

=== As featured artist ===
Title	Year	Peak chart positions				Certifications	Album
Title	Year	US	US R&B/HH	CAN	UK	Certifications	Album
"K Lo K" (Tory Lanez featuring Fivio Foreign)	2020	—	—	86	—		Non-album single
"Rounds" (Calboy featuring Fivio Foreign)	2020	—	—	—	—		Long Live the Kings
"Ah Ah Ah" (DreamDoll featuring Fivio Foreign)	2020	—	—	—	—		Non-album single
"Dominican Mami" (DaniLeigh featuring Fivio Foreign)	2020	—	—	—	—		Movie
"Couped Out" (Famous Dex featuring Fivio Foreign)	2020	—	—	—	—		Diana
"I Am What I Am" (King Von featuring Fivio Foreign)	2020	— (Note: "I Am What I Am" did not enter the Billboard Hot 100, but peaked at number eight on the Bubbling Under Hot 100 chart.)	—	—	—	RIAA: Gold	Welcome to O'Block
"Fashion" (The Plug and M24 featuring Fivio Foreign)	2021	—	—	—	—		Non-album single
"Body (Remix)" (Russ Millions and Tion Wayne featuring ArrDee, E1 (3x3), Bugzy Malone, Fivio Foreign, ZT (3x3), Darkoo and Buni)	2021	— (Note: "Body" did not enter the Billboard Hot 100, but peaked at number five on the Bubbling Under Hot 100 chart.)	46	16	1		Green With Envy and Pier Pressure
"Spin Music" (with Toosii)	2021	—	—	—	—		Thank You for Believing (The Manifestation)
"Not in the Mood" (Lil Tjay featuring Fivio Foreign and Kay Flock)	2021	61	22	35	75		Non-album single
"Panicking" (with French Montana)	2021	—	—	—	—		They Got Amnesia
"We Go Up" (Nicki Minaj featuring Fivio Foreign)	2022	58	15	—	—		Queen Radio: Volume 1
"Make a Movie" (Kay Flock featuring Fivio Foreign)	2022	—	—	—	—		Non-album single
"How I'm Living" (Maino and Rah Swish featuring Fivio Foreign)	2024	—	—	—	—		TBA

== Other charted songs ==
Title	Year	Peak chart positions							Certifications	Album
Title	Year	US	US R&B/HH	US Rap	CAN	FRA	NZ Hot	UK	Certifications	Album
"Demons" (Drake featuring Fivio Foreign and Sosa Geek)	2020	34	20	16	21	177	—	—		Dark Lane Demo Tapes
"Zoo York" (Lil Tjay featuring Fivio Foreign and Pop Smoke)	2020	65	28	25	38	—	—	65	RIAA: Platinum; MC: Platinum	State of Emergency
"Spicy" (Nas featuring Fivio Foreign and A$AP Ferg)	2020	96	36	—	—	—	—	—		King's Disease
"Clueless" (Polo G featuring Pop Smoke and Fivio Foreign)	2021	79	32	—	40	—	—	—	RIAA: Gold	Hall of Fame
"Off the Grid" (Kanye West featuring Playboi Carti and Fivio Foreign)	2021	11	4	4	7	44	—	15	RIAA: Platinum; MC: Gold	Donda
"Straight to It" (King Von featuring Fivio Foreign)	2022	93	34	—	95	—	—	—		What It Means to Be King
"Through the Fire" (featuring Quavo)	2022	—	—	—	—	—	40	—		B.I.B.L.E.
"What's My Name" (with Queen Naija featuring Coi Leray)	2022	— (Note: "What's My Name" did not enter the Billboard Hot 100, but peaked at number 15 on the Bubbling Under Hot 100 chart.)	49	—	—	—	31	—	RIAA: Gold	B.I.B.L.E.
"Changed on Me" (featuring Vory and Polo G)	2022	— (Note: "Changed on Me" did not enter the Billboard Hot 100, but peaked at number one on the Bubbling Under Hot 100 chart.)	38	—	86	—	25	—		B.I.B.L.E.
"Bla Bla" (Lil Tjay featuring Fivio Foreign)	2023	—	—	—	—	—	37	—		222

== Guest appearances ==
List of non-single guest appearances, with other performing artists
Title	Year	Other artist(s)	Album
"Sweetheart"	2020	Pop Smoke	Meet the Woo 2
"Basic"	2020	SimxSantana	Trenches2Riches
"Runtz (Remix)"	2020	Curly Savv	Glocky Szn
"Demons"	2020	Drake, Sosa Geek	Dark Lane Demo Tapes
"Zoo York"	2020	Lil Tjay, Pop Smoke	State of Emergency
"Shoot for the Stars"	2020	Lil Tjay	State of Emergency
"Off Shit"	2020	Black Fortune	Osshlord
"Baddie Betty Boop"	2020	Sleepy Hallow	Sleepy Hallow Presents: Sleepy for President
"SPIDER-MAN"	2020	Ron Suno	SWAG LIKE MIKE
"Showin Off Pt.1"	2020	Pop Smoke	Shoot for the Stars, Aim for the Moon (Deluxe)
"Showin Off Pt.2"	2020	Pop Smoke	Shoot for the Stars, Aim for the Moon (Deluxe)
"Spicy"	2020	Nas, A$AP Ferg	King's Disease
"Aussie Freaks"	2020	A$AP Ferg, Onefour	Floor Seats II
"Ryder"	2021	DJ Drewski	Seat at the Table
"Out the Dirt"	2021	Jay Critch	Critch Tape
"Hello Baby"	2021	Young M.A	Off the Yak
"Still Catching Cases"	2021	42 Dugg, Rowdy Rebel	Free Dem Boyz
"Clueless"	2021	Polo G, Pop Smoke	Hall of Fame
"LIT BITCH"	2021	Chinese Kitty, French Montana	SMD
"Off the Grid"	2021	Kanye West, Playboi Carti	Donda
"murda one"	2021	Roddy Ricch	Live Life Fast
"Record Me Baby // Ray Ray Skit"	2022	Jim Jones, Ball Greezy	Gangsta Grillz: We Set The Trends
"On Top"	2022	Mary J. Blige	Good Morning Gorgeous
"Straight to It"	2022	King Von	What It Means to Be King
"Mountains"	2022	Coi Leray, Young M.A	Trendsetter
"To the Moon (Drill Remix)"	2022	JNR Choi, G Herbo, Russ Millions, M24, Sam Tompkins	Non-single remix
"Easy"	2022	Sfera Ebbasta, Rvssian	Italiano
"Opt Out"	2022	Millyz	Blanco 5
"Slide"	2022	Lobby Boyz, Jim Jones, Maino	The Lobby Boyz
"C.A.B. (Catch a Body)"	2022	Chris Brown	Breezy
"Groovy"	2022	Seddy Hendrinx	Well Sed
"Kiss Ya Neck"	2022	Sheff G, Rowdy Rebel	From The Can
"Paid Off"	2022	Rowdy Rebel	Rebel Vs. Rowdy
"Ay Lala"	2023	Malik Montana, Luciano, Baby Gang	Adwokat Diabla
"No Pressure"	2023	Rowdy Rebel, Fetty Luciano, Rah Swish	Splash Brothers
"Bla Bla"	2023	Lil Tjay	222
"Pissing Me Off"	2024	Rowdy Rebel, Fetty Luciano	Splash Brothers 2
