= One Take (disambiguation) =

One take is a film genre.

It may also refer to:

- "One Take", a song by Lil Tjay
- One Take, a documentary about BNK48
