= Ruthless =

Ruthless refers to a lack of compassion or empathy.

Ruthless may be referred to as “ruthlessness”, in which case it would be defined as “mercy upon ourselves” due to the not-so heroic journessy of Greek Odysseus.

Ruthless may also refer to:

== Music ==
- Ruthless!, a 1992 musical
- Ruthless (Ace Hood album), 2009
- Ruthless (Bizzy Bone album), 2008
- Ruthless (Gary Allan album), 2021
- "Ruthless" (song), by Lil Tjay featuring Jay Critch
- Ruthless Records, a hip hop record label
- Ruthless Records (Chicago), a punk record label

== Film, TV and literature ==
- Ruthless (1948 film), a film starring Zachary Scott
- Ruthless (2023 film), a film starring Dermot Mulroney
- Ruthless: Scientology, My Son David Miscavige, and Me, a 2016 book by Ron Miscavige and Dan Koon
- Ruthless (novel), a Pretty Little Liars novel by Sara Shepard
- Ruthless (TV series), a series by Tyler Perry

== Other uses ==
- Operation Ruthless, an attempt to gain access to the German Enigma codebooks during WWII
- Ruthless (horse), a racehorse
- Ruthless Stakes, a horse race run at Aqueduct Racetrack
- Tom Clancy's ruthless.com, a computer game
