= Go In =

Single by Lil Tjay

Single by Lil Tjay
- Released: December 13, 2019
- Length: 4:14
- Label: Columbia
- Songwriter: Tione Merritt
- Producer: JD on Tha Track

Lil Tjay singles chronology
"Mary Jane" (2019)	"Go In" (2019)	"20/20" (2020)

"Go In" is a single by American rapper Lil Tjay, released on December 13, 2019, by Columbia Records. It was produced by JD on Tha Track.

== Charts ==
Chart (2019)	Peak position
Canada Hot 100 (Billboard)	85
US Bubbling Under Hot 100 (Billboard)	9
US Hot R&B/Hip-Hop Songs (Billboard)	50

== Certifications ==
Region	Certification	Certified units/sales
United States (RIAA)	Gold	500,000^{‡}
^{‡} Sales+streaming figures based on certification alone.
