= 20/20 (Lil Tjay song) =

2020 single by Lil Tjay

Single by Lil Tjay
- Released: January 1, 2020
- Length: 3:50
- Label: Columbia
- Songwriters: Tione Merritt; Placido Diego Elson; Levi de Jong
- Producers: Dovgh; Woodpecker

Lil Tjay singles chronology
"Go In" (2019)	"20/20" (2020)	"Valentino (Remix)" (2020)

Music video
- "20/20" on YouTube

"20/20" is a single by American rapper Lil Tjay, released on January 1, 2020, by Columbia Records.

== Composition ==
The song begins with a piano introduction for about 40 seconds, before "precise bass and skittering percussion" plays in the instrumental with Lil Tjay beginning his verse. He sing-raps about his newfound fame and his desire to maintain the success of his rap career. He also shouts out to Jay-Z and repeatedly sings, "I'mma soon be the greatest."

== Critical reception ==
Mitch Findlay of HotNewHipHop praised the song, writing that "The hypnotic instrumental provides a relaxing backdrop, and Tjay's flow remains sharp without invading the space."

== Music video ==
A music video for the song was released on February 4, 2020. Directed by Sophie Caraan, it sees Lil Tjay in Miami via private jet, being chauffeured in expensive car and in a private yacht with his friends.

== Charts ==
Chart (2020)	Peak position
Canada Hot 100 (Billboard)	64
New Zealand Hot Singles (RMNZ)	24
US Billboard Hot 100	94
US Hot R&B/Hip-Hop Songs (Billboard)	44

== Certifications ==
Region	Certification	Certified units/sales
United States (RIAA)	Platinum	1,000,000^{‡}
^{‡} Sales+streaming figures based on certification alone.
