= Sex Sounds =

2019 song by Lil Tjay

Song by Lil Tjay

from the album True 2 Myself
- Released: October 11, 2019
- Length: 2:42
- Label: Columbia
- Songwriters: Tione Merritt; Xavier McKoy
- Producer: Zay Love

Music video
- "Sex Sounds" on YouTube

"Sex Sounds" is a song by American rapper Lil Tjay from his debut studio album True 2 Myself (2019). It was produced by Zay Love.

== Composition ==
"Sex Sounds" is a pop-leaning song with a piano instrumental.

== Critical reception ==
The song was met with negative reception from music critics. Reviewing True 2 Myself for Pitchfork, Alphonse Pierre stated "The album format gives Tjay a little room to stretch, something that's nearly impossible when he's only releasing one single a month. Some experiments work, like the traditional R&B ballad 'Mixed Emotions.' The 'BET Uncut' slow jam 'Sex Sounds,' meanwhile, is way too much: Hearing him sing 'The way you kiss me when I'm stroking deep inside' is like finding porn in your little brother's internet history." M.T. Richards of Consequence of Sound criticized that Lil Tjay "seems so unsure of himself" on the song, which he also described as "remedial". Maxwell Cavaseno of HotNewHipHop commented, "When he does go into soft lover-man mode on 'Sex Sounds' it's both the slowest and perhaps the lowest point of the album."

== Music video ==
An official music video was released on April 8, 2020. It shows Lil Tjay spending time with his female lover in the bedroom and the tropics, including at the beach, in a rainforest, and traveling through paths shaded by palm trees. The clip features appearances of cabana beds.

== Certifications ==
Certifications for "Sex Sounds"
Region	Certification	Certified units/sales
Italy (FIMI)	Gold	50,000^{‡}
New Zealand (RMNZ)	Platinum	30,000^{‡}
Spain (Promusicae)	Gold	30,000^{‡}
United Kingdom (BPI)	Platinum	600,000^{‡}
United States (RIAA)	2× Platinum	2,000,000^{‡}
^{‡} Sales+streaming figures based on certification alone.
