= Goin Up (song) =

2022 single by Lil Tjay

Single by Lil Tjay
- Released: April 29, 2022
- Length: 2:20
- Label: Columbia
- Songwriters: Tione Merritt; Darrell Jackson
- Producer: Chopsquad DJ

Lil Tjay singles chronology
"In My Head" (2022)	"Goin Up" (2022)	"24 Hrs" (2022)

Music video
- "Goin Up" on YouTube

"Goin Up" is a single by American rapper Lil Tjay, released on April 29, 2022 via Columbia Records. It was produced by Chopsquad DJ.

== Composition ==
The song contains piano-laced production, over which Lil Tjay reflects on his experience as a young artist and rise to fame, detailing his material possessions as a result of wealth and touching on themes such as loyalty and respect.

== Music video ==
A music video for the song was released.

== Charts ==
Chart performance for "Goin Up"
Chart (2022)	Peak position
Canada Hot 100 (Billboard)	81
New Zealand Hot Singles (RMNZ)	18
