= Give You What You Want =

2022 single by Lil Tjay

Single by Lil Tjay
- Released: November 11, 2022
- Length: 2:39
- Label: Columbia
- Songwriters: Tione Merritt; Michael Washington Jr.; Jackson LoMastro; Francis Leblanc; TobiTurnUp
- Producers: Mike Wavvs; Jack LoMastro; Fridayy; TobiTurnUp

Lil Tjay singles chronology
"Beat the Odds" (2022)	"Give You What You Want" (2022)	"Eastside (Remix)" (2022)

Music video
- "Give You What You Want" on YouTube

"Give You What You Want" is a single by American rapper Lil Tjay, released on November 11, 2022, via Columbia Records. It was produced by Mike Wavvs, Jack LoMastro, Fridayy and TobiTurnUp.

== Composition ==
The production contains guitar chords, piano, and "soft bass hits, persistently sharp hi-hats, and a simple snare" for drums. Lyrically, Lil Tjay courts to a romantic interest through a style of rap-singing. The chorus of the song features a sampled vocals.

== Critical reception ==
Gabriel Bras Nevares of HotNewHipHop wrote in regard to the production, "It's an understated melodic and harmonic approach, but he feels right at home with his thoughts", additionally writing "Finally, the vocal sample makes for a beautiful hook and the track's predominant and catchiest melody." David Aaron Brake of HipHopDX called the song a "welcome reminder of his prowess from NYC to far beyond."

== Charts ==
Chart performance for "Give You What You Want"
Chart (2022)	Peak position
Canada Hot 100 (Billboard)	100
New Zealand Hot Singles (RMNZ)	8
