= Shake It (Kay Flock song) =

2022 single by Kay Flock featuring Cardi B, Dougie B, and Bory300

Single by Kay Flock featuring Cardi B, Dougie B, and Bory300
- Released: April 15, 2022
- Genre: Drill
- Length: 1:58
- Label: Capitol
- Songwriters: Kevin Perez; Belcalis Almanzar; Arion Howard; Cory Wright; Hensel Dominguez; Akon Thiam
- Producer: Elias Beats

Kay Flock singles chronology
"Being Honest (Remix)" (2021)	"Shake It" (2022)	"Make a Movie" (2022)

Cardi B singles chronology
"Rumors" (2021)	"Shake It" (2022)	"Hot Shit" (2022)

Music video
- "Shake It" on YouTube

"Shake It" is a song by American rapper Kay Flock featuring fellow American rappers Cardi B, Dougie B, and Bory300. Released on April 15, 2022, it samples Akon's 2005 song "Belly Dancer (Bananza)". The music video was released on Kay Flock's YouTube channel, and features the rappers outside a convenience store in The Bronx, New York. It is Kay Flock's first single since releasing his debut project The D.O.A. Tape. "Shake It" became Kay Flock's highest-charting song so far on the US Billboard Hot 100, as well as Dougie B's and Bory300's first entry on the chart. It became Cardi's 40th entry on the chart. On April 24, 2023, the song was certified Gold by the RIAA.

== Critical reception ==
Billboard called it an "all-new hip-hop banger". Remezcla said that Cardi B "is showing her artistic diversity and owning it". Complex wrote that Cardi B "showcases her drill flow" and "comes out swinging" in the "hard-hitting" song. Pitchfork noted that, on "Shake It", Cardi B "circles back to the foundation" of her previous singles "Pull Up", "Red Barz", and her mixtape era, asserting that the collaboration "isn't a shameless trend-hop", and further adding that, "unsurprisingly, [in the song] the real highlight is Cardi, who dials into a harsh flow that feels inspired by Kay. She fits right in." The Source said that Kay Flock performs "fierce sliding through the track", Dougie B and Bory300 "add their own drill tastes to the mix", and Cardi B "closes unleashing forceful lines that challenges any potential competitors". Uproxx called "Shake It" an "electrifying and raw drill record" and opined that Cardi B "absolutely kills her verse". Consequence also commented on her verse, saying that "[her] unbridled energy is the perfect fit for the sample drill production".

== Music video ==
The music video was directed by Jochi Saca, Alex and Tristan Demic, filmed in The Bronx, New York City. The clip features Cardi B performing her verse with "pin-straight red locks printed like a bandana". In an article about it, W magazine commented that "when it comes to statement hairstyles, no one does it like Cardi B". Drill rappers B-Lovee and Mula Gzz also appear.

== Charts ==
Chart performance for "Shake It"
Chart (2022)	Peak position
Canada Hot 100 (Billboard)	53
Global 200 (Billboard)	91
Hungary (Single Top 40)	17
New Zealand Hot Singles (RMNZ)	9
US Billboard Hot 100	51
US Hot R&B/Hip-Hop Songs (Billboard)	14

== Certifications ==
Certifications for "Shake It"
Region	Certification	Certified units/sales
United States (RIAA)	Platinum	1,000,000^{‡}
^{‡} Sales+streaming figures based on certification alone.
