= Beat the Odds (song) =

2022 single by Lil Tjay

Single by Lil Tjay
- Released: August 26, 2022
- Length: 2:30
- Label: Columbia
- Songwriters: Tione Merritt; Desirez beats; Keegan Bach; Kavi Lybarger; Chanté (Marie) Berry-Gordon
- Producers: Desirez beats; KBeaZy; KXVI; Chanté Marie

Lil Tjay singles chronology
| "24 Hrs" (2022) | "Beat the Odds" (2022) | "Give You What You Want" (2022) |

Music video
- "Beat the Odds" on YouTube

"Beat the Odds" is a song by American rapper Lil Tjay, released on August 26, 2022 with an accompanying music video. It was produced by Desirez beats, KBeaZy and KXVI. The song sees Tjay addressing his shooting in June 2022. On July 14, 2023, a remix titled "Beat the Odds Pt 2" was released as part of Lil Tjay's third studio album 222, and features frequent collaborator Polo G.

== Background ==
On June 22, 2022, Lil Tjay was shot multiple times (7 times) during an attempted robbery in Edgewater, New Jersey. On August 24, he provided an update on his health since his hospitalization in June in a video on Instagram and announced new music. "Beat the Odds" was then released two days later.

== Composition ==
The song has been described as a "florid, melodic track". Lyrically, Lil Tjay recounts his experience of the shooting incident and his recovery, as well as other hard times in his life, especially reflecting on violence-related memories and also being motivated in life by his family.

== Music video ==
A music video for the song was directed by Lil Tjay himself. It opens with audio of 911 calls from the day of the shooting, before showing Tjay laying down and wearing an oxygen mask. The clip features footage of him recovering, writing and recording the song, and being visited by family and friends. He later leaves the hospital in a wheelchair, and is seen in a church expressing gratitude for his survival before returning to the studio.

== Charts ==
Chart performance for "Beat the Odds"
| Chart (2022) | Peak position |
|---|---|
| Australia (ARIA) | 72 |
| Canada Hot 100 (Billboard) | 27 |
| Global 200 (Billboard) | 64 |
| Ireland (IRMA) | 80 |
| New Zealand Hot Singles (RMNZ) | 4 |
| Sweden Heatseeker (Sverigetopplistan) | 1 |
| UK Singles (Official Charts) | 41 |
| US Billboard Hot 100 | 36 |
| US Hot R&B/Hip-Hop Songs (Billboard) | 12 |
| US Rhythmic Airplay (Billboard) | 17 |

== Certifications ==
Certifications for "Beat the Odds"
| Region | Certification | Certified units/sales |
|---|---|---|
| United States (RIAA) | Gold | 500,000^{‡} |
^{‡} Sales+streaming figures based on certification alone.

== Release history ==
Release dates and formats for "Beat the Odds"
| Region | Date | Format(s) | Label | Ref. |
|---|---|---|---|---|
| Various | August 26, 2022 | Digital download; streaming | Columbia | |
| United States | September 6, 2022 | Rhythmic contemporary radio | Columbia | |
| United States | September 6, 2022 | Urban contemporary radio | Columbia | |
