= Skinnyfromthe9 =

American rapper and singer

- Born: David Villegas; December 19, 1995 (age 30); Hialeah, Florida, U.S.
- Origin: Somerville, New Jersey, U.S.
- Genres: Pop rap; R&B; trap
- Occupations: Rapper; singer
- Instrument: Vocals
- Years active: 2014–present
- Website: www.skinnyfromthe9.com

David Alex Villegas (born December 19, 1995), known by his stage name Skinnyfromthe9 (formerly stylized $kinnyFromThe9), is an American rapper and singer from Somerville, New Jersey. He first gained widespread attention after releasing his 2017 song "Love Blast". He signed with L.A. Reid's record label, HITCO, in 2018, and parted ways with the label by 2020.

== Early life ==
David Alex Villegas was born in Hialeah, Florida. He is of mixed Puerto Rican, Colombian, and Dominican descent. He grew up largely in Somerville, New Jersey, although he and his family moved around frequently. As a child, his father was imprisoned, and his mother became involved with another man. During Villegas' adolescence, his mother and stepfather engaged in scams and identity fraud until his stepfather was eventually caught and spent time in prison. Villegas also spent time living in homeless shelters and hotels as a youth. He began focusing on hip hop as a teenager after his father purchased a mic for him. He adopted the stage name, Skinnyfromthe9, because his nickname was "Skinny" and he was from area code 908 (colloquially, "the 9").

== Career ==
Skinnyfromthe9 began putting his music on SoundCloud in 2016. In 2017, he released the songs, "Family Rich" featuring Jay Critch and "Count It" featuring Stitches. In late 2017, he released the single, "Love Blast," which would go on to accumulate more than 3.5 million streams on SoundCloud. In January 2018, Skinny joined Fetty Wap on his "FMF Tour." Later that year, it was announced that he had signed to L.A. Reid's new record label, HITCO.

In April 2018, he released a music video for "Love Blast" and also released the single, "Back When I Was Broke." The following month, he published music videos for "Back When I Was Broke" and "Pink Choppas." Rappers Wiz Khalifa and Russ made cameos in the former video. Later that month, Skinny also released the songs, "Space" and "I Drip."

Beginning in June 2018, Skinny was supposed to join rapper, 24hrs, on his "3200 Lenox Rd." tour, but 24hrs was hospitalized in June, and the tour was canceled. In July 2018, Skinny made a cameo appearance in the video for PnB Rock's "London." The following month, he released the single, "Jump Out That," featuring PnB Rock. Later in August, Skinny was arrested on suspicion of simple assault and theft.

In October 2018, while serving time in jail, he released a freestyle rap along with two more songs, "Alone" and "Songs About You." He was released from jail in November 2018. Soon after his release, he published the music video for his song, "Just Left Jail." His mixtape, It's An Evil World, was released on November 30, 2018, through HITCO. It featured guest appearances from Fetty Wap, PnB Rock, and Kap G.

== Legal issues ==
Since 2014, Skinnyfromthe9 has been charged with several minor offenses such as shoplifting and reckless driving. Many of those charges were later dropped.

In August 2018, Skinny, his father, his brother, and a fourth defendant were arrested and charged with kidnapping and aggravated assault in relation to an incident in Somerset County, New Jersey in which the four men were accused of luring another man into a vehicle and striking him. In September, the charges for Skinny were downgraded to luring an adult, simple assault, and theft after he took a plea deal that also allowed him to avoid prison time in exchange for a probation sentence. Skinny has maintained his innocence, claiming that the person who brought charges against him stole a chain worth $8,000.

== Discography ==
=== Mixtapes ===
List of mixtapes with selected mixtape details
Title	Mixtape details
Highly Clouted	Released: July 6, 2016; Label: Bluntside; Formats: Digital download, streaming
No Losses	Released: December 19, 2016; Label: 9ifferent Breed Entertainment; Formats: Digital download, streaming
It's An Evil World	Released: November 30, 2018; Label: HITCO; Formats: Digital download, Streaming
Skinny Wit The Zoo (with Fetty Wap)	Released: June 28, 2019; Label: The DisPensary; Formats: Digital download, streaming
Love Me Now	Released: March 12, 2021; Label: Self-released; Formats: Digital download, streaming
No More Favors	Released: December 1, 2023; Label: Self-released; Formats: Digital download, streaming

=== Extended plays ===
List of EPs, with selected details
Title	EP details
#FreeSkinny	Released: 2018; Label: Self-released; Format: Digital download, streaming
9 Tail Fox Mode	Released: March 13, 2020; Label: Self-released; Format: Digital download, streaming
Hearts On Fire	Released: August 12, 2022; Label: Self-released; Format: Digital download, streaming
Money In The Bank (with Jay Rose)	Released: January 26, 2023; Label: Futures Bright Records; Format: Digital download, streaming
Forever Ballin	Released: May 20, 2023; Label: Self-released; Format: Digital download, streaming

=== Singles ===
List of singles showing year released and album name
Title	Year	Album
"Family Rich" (feat. Jay Critch)	2017	Non-album single
"In My Feelings" (feat. Hitta Castro)	2017	Non-album single
"Love Blast"	2017	It's An Evil World
"Back When I Was Broke"	2018	It's An Evil World
"Jump Out That" (feat. PnB Rock)	2018	It's An Evil World
"Murder She Wrote" (feat. Sunny Jorge)	2022	Non-album single
