= F.N (song) =

2019 single by Lil Tjay

Single by Lil Tjay

from the album F.N and True 2 Myself
- Released: August 22, 2019
- Genre: Trap
- Length: 3:44
- Label: Columbia; Sony Music
- Songwriters: Tione Merritt; Matthew Bell; Artem Romanov
- Producer: VZNARE

Lil Tjay singles chronology
"Laneswitch" (2019)	"F.N" (2019)	"Hold On" (2019)

Music video
- "F.N" on YouTube

"F.N" ("Fuck Nigga") is a song by American rapper Lil Tjay, from his second EP of the same name and his debut studio album True 2 Myself (2019). The song was written by Lil Tjay, Artem Romanov, and its producer Vznare. It peaked at number 56 on the Billboard Hot 100.

== Composition ==
The track features a midtempo trap beat. Lil Tjay reflects on his rise to fame, and its impact on his relationships with people he made prior to his success.

In an interview with Complex, Tjay stated that the song "is just me talking about my feelings toward snitches and rats"; in the chorus, he sings about how betrayal has hardened him, with lyrics such as "Used to fuck with you, now I'm wishing that a bus hit you."

== Charts ==
=== Weekly charts ===
Chart (2019–2021)	Peak position
Canada Hot 100 (Billboard)	39
Ireland (IRMA)	73
UK Singles (OCC)	69
UK Hip Hop/R&B (OCC)	39
US Billboard Hot 100	56
US Hot R&B/Hip-Hop Songs (Billboard)	23

=== Year-end charts ===
Chart (2019)	Position
US Hot R&B/Hip-Hop Songs (Billboard)	89

== Certifications ==
Region	Certification	Certified units/sales
Canada (Music Canada)	2× Platinum	160,000^{‡}
Denmark (IFPI Danmark)	Platinum	90,000^{‡}
France (SNEP)	Gold	100,000^{‡}
Italy (FIMI)	Gold	50,000^{‡}
New Zealand (RMNZ)	Platinum	30,000^{‡}
Portugal (AFP)	Gold	5,000^{‡}
United Kingdom (BPI)	Platinum	600,000^{‡}
United States (RIAA)	6× Platinum	6,000,000^{‡}
Streaming
Greece (IFPI Greece)	Gold	1,000,000^{†}
^{‡} Sales+streaming figures based on certification alone.^{†} Streaming-only figures based on certification alone.
