= True 2 Myself =

Studio album by Lil Tjay
- Released: October 11, 2019
- Genre: Hip hop; trap; R&B
- Length: 55:57
- Label: Columbia
- Producer: CashMoneyAP; Drü Oliver; Dystinkt Beatz; Hemmieonthebeat; JD On Tha Track; JTK; VZNARE; Nagra; Nick Cavalieri; Protegé Beatz; Relly Made; TnTXD; Zay Love; Ziggyonthekeyboard

Lil Tjay chronology
F.N (2019)	True 2 Myself (2019)	State of Emergency (2020)

Singles from True 2 Myself
- 1. "Brothers" Released: July 9, 2018; 2. "Leaked" Released: September 6, 2018; 3. "Goat" Released: December 21, 2018; 4. "Ruthless" Released: May 3, 2019; 5. "Laneswitch" Released: July 26, 2019; 6. "F.N" Released: August 22, 2019; 7. "Hold On" Released: September 27, 2019

True 2 Myself is the debut studio album by American rapper Lil Tjay. It was released on October 11, 2019, through Columbia Records. The production on the album was handled by multiple producers including CashMoneyAP, TnTXD, JD On Tha Track and Dystinkt Beatz among others. The album also features guest appearances from Rileyy Lanez, Jay Critch, Lil Baby, Lil Durk, and Lil Wayne.

True 2 Myself was supported by seven singles: "Brothers", "Leaked", "Goat", "Ruthless", "Laneswitch", "F.N" and "Hold On". The album received generally positive reviews from music critics and was a commercial success. It debuted at number five on the US Billboard 200 chart earning 45,000 album-equivalent units in its first week. The album was certified double platinum by the Recording Industry Association of America (RIAA) in February 2023.

== Background ==
The artists announced his debut studio album on October 9, 2019, via his social media and revealed the tracklist as well as the cover art of the album. Being asked about the album title, he explained that he wants "to make sure that I put myself first and accomplish what I need to accomplish". To him, the album represents his "next level of success" and as a result, he needs "be true to who I am and focus on that main goal".

== Critical reception ==
Professional ratings
Review scores
Source	Rating
Consequence of Sound	B+
HotNewHipHop	73%
Pitchfork	6.5/10

Alphonse Pierre of Pitchfork rated the album 6.5/10, stating that the album "is a playlist of soon-to-be singles grouped under the industry-formality heading of an "album". In a positive review, M. T. Richards at Consequence of Sound complimented the production, emphasizing how the beats are "very pretty second fiddle, never crowding Tjay out but always making their presence felt".

== Commercial performance ==
True 2 Myself debuted at number five on the US Billboard 200 chart, earning 45,000 album-equivalent units (including 1,000 copies in pure album sales) in its first week. This became Lil Tjay's first US top-ten debut on the chart. In its second week, the album dropped to number eight on the chart, earning an additional 31,000 units. On February 21, 2023, the album was certified double platinum by the Recording Industry Association of America (RIAA) for combined sales and album-equivalent units of over two million units in the United States.

== Track listing ==
Track listing and credits adapted from Apple Music and Tidal.

No.	Title	Writer(s)	Producer(s)	Length
1.	"One Take"	Tione Merritt; Alphanso Cole	Ziggyonthekeyboard	2:48
2.	"Hold On"	Merritt; João Duarte; Jugraj Nagra	JD On Tha Track; Nagra	3:09
3.	"F.N"	Merritt; Artem Romanov; Matthew Bell	VZNARE	3:44
4.	"Dream That I Had"	Merritt; Jordan Knight	JTK	2:45
5.	"Post to Be" (featuring Rileyy Lanez)	Merritt; Drü Oliver; Nick Cavalieri; Haley Smith	Oliver; Cavalieri	3:09
6.	"Ruthless" (featuring Jay Critch)	Merritt; Jason Critchlow; Gerail Harvey	Relly Made	4:04
7.	"Mixed Emotions"	Merritt; Harvey; Jason Patterson	Relly Made	3:01
8.	"Decline" (featuring Lil Baby)	Merritt; Dominique Jones; Raheem Fennel; Thomas Horton	Hemmieonthebeat; TnTXD	3:45
9.	"Sex Sounds"	Merritt; Xavier McKoy	Zay Love	2:42
10.	"Leaked"	Merritt; Tomislav Ratešić	Dystinkt Beatz	3:40
11.	"Laneswitch"	Merritt; Duarte; Nagra; Warren McQueen	JD On Tha Track; Nagra	2:30
12.	"Brothers"	Merritt; Demetrie Glover; Duarte	JD On Tha Track; Protegé Beatz	3:30
13.	"Goat"	Merritt; Alex Petit	CashMoneyAP	4:02
14.	"Top of My Game"	Merritt; Mckoy	Zay Love	2:27
15.	"No Escape"	Merritt; Esmerlyn Toribio; Ratešić	Dystinkt Beatz	3:44
16.	"Brothers" (Remix) (featuring Lil Durk)	Merritt; Durk Banks; Glover; Duarte	JD On Tha Track; Protegé Beatz	3:30
17.	"Leaked" (Remix) (featuring Lil Wayne)	Merritt; Dwayne Carter, Jr.; Ratešić	Dystinkt Beatz	3:20
Total length:				55:57

== Charts ==
=== Weekly charts ===
Chart (2019)	Peak position
Australian Albums (ARIA)	59
Belgian Albums (Ultratop Flanders)	159
Canadian Albums (Billboard)	2
Dutch Albums (Album Top 100)	40
Irish Albums (IRMA)	57
UK Albums (OCC)	22
US Billboard 200	5
US Top R&B/Hip-Hop Albums (Billboard)	5

=== Year-end charts ===
Chart (2019)	Position
US Top R&B/Hip-Hop Albums (Billboard)	90
Chart (2020)	Position
US Billboard 200	70
US Top R&B/Hip-Hop Albums (Billboard)	50
Chart (2021)	Position
US Billboard 200	150

== Certifications ==
Region	Certification	Certified units/sales
Canada (Music Canada)	Gold	40,000^{‡}
Denmark (IFPI Danmark)	Platinum	20,000^{‡}
New Zealand (RMNZ)	Platinum	15,000^{‡}
United Kingdom (BPI)	Gold	100,000^{‡}
United States (RIAA)	2× Platinum	2,000,000^{‡}
^{‡} Sales+streaming figures based on certification alone.
