= Laneswitch =

2019 single by Lil Tjay

Single by Lil Tjay

from the album F.N and True 2 Myself
- Released: July 26, 2019
- Length: 2:30
- Label: Columbia
- Songwriter(s): Tione Merritt; João Duarte; Jugraj Nagra; Warren McQueen
- Producer(s): JD On Tha Track; Nagra

Lil Tjay singles chronology
"Lying" (2019)	"Laneswitch" (2019)	"F.N" (2019)

Music video
- "Laneswitch" on YouTube

"Laneswitch" (stylized in all caps) is a song by American rapper Lil Tjay, released on July 26, 2019 as the fifth single from his EP F.N (2019) and debut studio album True 2 Myself (2019). It was produced by JD On Tha Track and Nagra.

== Composition and critical reception ==
Alex Zidel of HotNewHipHop described the song as "catchy". Farah Idrees of Earmilk wrote of the song, "Tjay showcases uniqueness in the way that the melodically flows over the subtle bounce of the beat. His rapping ability is equally distinct as he so honestly and confidently raps, 'F*ck it, I know I'm still young, I know I'm still dumb/ Man, I'm tryna change sh*t'. Authentic and playful, he doesn't shy away from repping New York and standing in his truth, he raps, 'My city, I'm tryna rename this' so rightfully confident; Lil Tjay is in this for the long haul."

== Music video ==
The music video was released alongside the single. It sees Lil Tjay being around his friends and performing at concerts.

== Certifications ==
Region	Certification	Certified units/sales
United States (RIAA)	Gold	500,000^{‡}
^{‡} Sales+streaming figures based on certification alone.
