= Hold On (Lil Tjay song) =

Single by Lil Tjay

Single by Lil Tjay

from the album True 2 Myself
- Released: September 27, 2019
- Length: 3:09
- Label: Columbia
- Songwriters: Tione Merritt; João Duarte; Jugraj Nagra
- Producers: JD On Tha Track; Nagra

Lil Tjay singles chronology
"World Fall Down" (2019)	"Hold On" (2019)	"War" (2019)

Music video
- "Hold On" on YouTube

"Hold On" is a song by American rapper Lil Tjay, released on September 27, 2019. It is the seventh single from his debut studio album True 2 Myself (2019).

== Composition ==
The song finds Lil Tjay sing-rapping about his rise to fame, and telling his loved ones to "hold on" and wait for his success ("I think it's time to shine, I've been waiting so long / Broski serving time, he been gone for so long / And I promise I'ma do this sh*t for us, just hold on").

== Charts ==
Chart (2019)	Peak position
Canada Hot 100 (Billboard)	75
US Bubbling Under Hot 100 (Billboard)	7
US Bubbling Under R&B/Hip-Hop Singles (Billboard)	3

== Certifications ==
Region	Certification	Certified units/sales
Canada (Music Canada)	Gold	40,000^{‡}
New Zealand (RMNZ)	Gold	15,000^{‡}
United Kingdom (BPI)	Silver	200,000^{‡}
United States (RIAA)	Platinum	1,000,000^{‡}
^{‡} Sales+streaming figures based on certification alone.
