= Leaked (song) =

2018 single by Lil Tjay

Single by Lil Tjay

from the album F.N and True 2 Myself
- Released: September 6, 2018
- Length: 3:40
- Label: Columbia
- Songwriters: Tione Merritt; Tomislav Ratesic
- Producer: Dystinkt Beatz

Lil Tjay singles chronology
"Brothers" (2018)	"Leaked" (2018)	"How Dare You" (2018)

Music video
- "Leaked (Remix)" on YouTube

"Leaked" is a single by American rapper Lil Tjay, released on September 6, 2018 by Columbia Records. It appears on his debut studio album True 2 Myself (2019), which also features the official remix of the song, featuring American rapper Lil Wayne. In the song, Lil Tjay sing-raps about his rise to fame as a rapper.

== Critical reception ==
In a review of True 2 Myself on HipHopDX, Daniel Spielberger wrote, "Though 'Leaked' is a tad more upbeat, it's monotonous and fails to hit an emotional crescendo."

== Music video ==
A music video for the remix was released on December 20, 2019 and was directed by Gil Green. It is set in a circus-themed carnival, where Lil Tjay and Lil Wayne have a party under a tent, surrounded by female dancers.

== Charts ==
Chart (2019)	Peak position
Canada Hot 100 (Billboard)	97
US Bubbling Under Hot 100 (Billboard)	19

== Certifications ==
Region	Certification	Certified units/sales
Canada (Music Canada)	Gold	40,000^{‡}
New Zealand (RMNZ)	Platinum	30,000^{‡}
United Kingdom (BPI)	Gold	400,000^{‡}
United States (RIAA)	2× Platinum	2,000,000^{‡}
^{‡} Sales+streaming figures based on certification alone.
