= Zoo York (song) =

2020 song by Lil Tjay featuring Fivio Foreign and Pop Smoke

Song by Lil Tjay featuring Fivio Foreign and Pop Smoke

from the EP State of Emergency
- Released: May 8, 2020
- Genre: Brooklyn drill
- Length: 3:34
- Label: Columbia
- Songwriters: Tione Merritt; Maxie Ryles III; Bashar Jackson; Brendan Walsh; Luis Campozano Jr.
- Producers: Non Native; Bordeaux

Music video
- "Zoo York" on YouTube

"Zoo York" is a song by American rapper Lil Tjay, released on May 8, 2020 from his third EP State of Emergency. It features American rappers Fivio Foreign and Pop Smoke, and was produced by Non Native and Bordeaux.

== Composition ==
"Zoo York" is a drill song that finds the three rappers detailing the features of New York City, where they all come from. Lil Tjay performs in his signature melodic sound, while the beat is influenced by the UK drill style.

== Critical reception ==
Reviewing State of Emergency for NME, Kyann-Sian Williams wrote "you might expect their collaboration 'Zoo York' to be the standout track here. True, Tjay's hook is as catchy as ever, but the song – like the EP as a whole – comes off as a transparent attempt to jump on the current hype around New York drill. The UK drill-inspired instrumental is impactful and menacing but seems at odds with Tjay's sweet auto-tune. Smoke's verse sounds worked in over an instrumental; it's tough to listen to because he'd clearly have slain the track if he'd been around to master it." Aaron Williams of Uproxx praised Lil Tjay's performance, stating he "proves equally adept at the more rambunctious approach, demonstrating his versatility as a rapper and justifying his growing hype alongside some of the city's other burgeoning superstars like Foreign, Smoke, and Jay Critch."

== Music video ==
The music video was directed by JL Shot That and released alongside the song. It sees the rappers and their crews dancing and partying in crowds in different locations of New York City, including the streets and highway, with police appearing on the streets as well. The celebrations feature moshing and the use of flamethrowers. Some attendees wear face masks due to the COVID-19 pandemic. The clip contains footage of Pop Smoke performing in places such as onstage, in the studio and in clubs, as well as appearing on the street alongside rapper Calboy, and that of people wearing Meet the Woo merchandise.

== Charts ==
Chart performance for "Zoo York"
Chart (2020)	Peak position
Canada Hot 100 (Billboard)	38
Ireland (IRMA)	91
UK Singles (OCC)	65
US Billboard Hot 100	65
US Hot R&B/Hip-Hop Songs (Billboard)	28

== Certifications ==
Certifications for "Zoo York"
Region	Certification	Certified units/sales
Canada (Music Canada)	Platinum	80,000^{‡}
United Kingdom (BPI)	Silver	200,000^{‡}
United States (RIAA)	Platinum	1,000,000^{‡}
^{‡} Sales+streaming figures based on certification alone.
