= Farewell (EP) =

EP by Lil Tjay
- Released: December 6, 2024
- Recorded: 2023–2024
- Length: 22:50
- Label: Columbia
- Producers: Armas; AwkwardCrazy; B-Dollaz; Chopsquad DJ; DanuVVS; Dmac; JD on tha Track; LaChaleur; LondnBlue; LuciG; Panndi; ProtegeBeatz; Savant; Sp7nish23; Tahj Money; TnTXD; TweekTune; Way9; WaZee Vibez

Lil Tjay chronology
222 (2023)	Farewell (2024)	They Just Ain't You (2026)

Singles from Farewell
- 1. "Told Ya" Released: January 12, 2024; 2. "Let It Go Baby" Released: November 22, 2024

Farewell is the fourth extended play by American rapper Lil Tjay. It was released on December 6, 2024 by Columbia Records. The album features guest appearances from NLE Choppa, Rich the Kid, Polo G and G Herbo. Farewell is dedicated as his departure from Columbia records, marking his last release under the label.

== Singles ==
The lead single "Told Ya" was released January 12, 2024 peaking at number 24 on the NZ Hot Singles Chart. The second single "Let It Go Baby" was released November 22, 2024, two weeks before the release of Farewell. Whilst not released on streaming platforms a music video for "Good Life" was released on February 14, 2024.

== Track listing ==
No.	Title	Writer(s)	Producer(s)	Length
1.	"Let It Go Baby"	Tione Merritt	WaZee Vibez	3:25
2.	"Told Ya"	Merritt	LuciG; AwkwardCrazy	2:48
3.	"Good Life"	Merritt	Way9; Panndi; B-Dollaz; Armas	2:46
4.	"Long Way from the Block"	Merritt	TweekTune; LaChaleur	2:07
5.	"Why" (featuring NLE Choppa)	Merritt; Bryson Potts	Chopsquad DJ	3:23
6.	"Back to the Wall" (with Polo G)	Merritt; Taurus Bartlett	Savant; Sp7nish23; DanuVVS	2:11
7.	"Upset" (with Rich the Kid)	Merritt; Dimitri Roger	JD on tha Track; ProtegeBeatz	3:22
8.	"Built Like a Soldier" (featuring G Herbo)	Merritt; Herbert Wright III	TnTXD; Tahj Money; Dmac; LondnBlue	2:43
Total length:				22:50
