= In My Head (Lil Tjay song) =

2022 single by Lil Tjay

Single by Lil Tjay
- Released: April 1, 2022
- Genre: Drill
- Length: 2:15
- Label: Columbia; Sony
- Songwriters: Tione Merritt; Keidran Jones; Jonathan Rotem; Timothy Thomas; Theron Thomas; Jason Desrouleaux; Kisean Anderson
- Producers: Yoshi; Yvng Finxssa

Lil Tjay singles chronology
"Elegance" (2022)	"In My Head" (2022)	"Goin Up" (2022)

Music video
- "In My Head" on YouTube

"In My Head" is a song by American rapper Lil Tjay. It was released as a single through Columbia Records and Sony Music on April 1, 2022. The song samples British singer Iyaz's 2009 debut single, "Replay". Due to sampling "Replay", Iyaz, producer J. R. Rotem, R. City duo members Timothy and Theron Thomas, and American singer-songwriters Jason Derulo and Sean Kingston are credited as songwriters alongside Tjay. "In My Head" was produced by Yoshi and Yvng Finxssa, mixed by Robbie Soukiasyan, mastered by Eric Lagg, and recorded by Barrington Hall.

== Background and promotion ==
"In My Head" is a drill song that sees Tjay melodically rap about heartbreak from a woman not being loyal.

== Music video ==
The official music video for "In My Head" was released alongside the song on April 1, 2022. It stars fellow American rapper Rubi Rose, who plays Tjay's love interest. It sees Tjay lying in a hospital bed and driving in a Mercedes-Benz truck.

== Charts ==
Chart performance for "In My Head"
Chart (2022)	Peak position
Australia (ARIA)	27
Austria (Ö3 Austria Top 40)	26
Canada Hot 100 (Billboard)	14
Denmark (Tracklisten)	20
France (SNEP)	180
Germany (GfK)	22
Global 200 (Billboard)	25
Hungary (Stream Top 40)	29
Iceland (Tónlistinn)	7
Ireland (IRMA)	27
Lithuania (AGATA)	88
Luxembourg (Billboard)	10
Netherlands (Single Top 100)	49
New Zealand Hot Singles (RMNZ)	3
Norway (VG-lista)	33
Portugal (AFP)	95
South Africa Streaming (TOSAC)	99
Sweden (Sverigetopplistan)	49
Switzerland (Schweizer Hitparade)	18
UK Singles (OCC)	18
US Billboard Hot 100	33
US Hot R&B/Hip-Hop Songs (Billboard)	8
US Rhythmic Airplay (Billboard)	10

== Certifications ==
Certifications for "In My Head"
Region	Certification	Certified units/sales
Canada (Music Canada)	Platinum	80,000^{‡}
New Zealand (RMNZ)	Gold	15,000^{‡}
United Kingdom (BPI)	Silver	200,000^{‡}
United States (RIAA)	Gold	500,000^{‡}
^{‡} Sales+streaming figures based on certification alone.

== Release history ==
Release history for "In My Head"
Region	Date	Format	Label	Ref.
Various	April 1, 2022	Digital download; streaming	Atlantic	
United States	April 12, 2022	Rhythmic contemporary radio	Atlantic	
United States	April 12, 2022	Urban contemporary radio	Atlantic	
