= Project Walls =

2023 single by Lil Tjay featuring YoungBoy Never Broke Again

Single by Lil Tjay featuring YoungBoy Never Broke Again

from the album 222
- Released: July 7, 2023
- Genre: Trap; drill
- Length: 2:32
- Label: Columbia
- Songwriters: Tione Merritt; Kentrell Gaulden; Tarik Johnston; Declan Roberts; Daniel Way
- Producers: Rvssian; Decster; Way9

Lil Tjay singles chronology
"June 22nd" (2023)	"Project Walls" (2023)

YoungBoy Never Broke Again singles chronology
"Cut U Off" (2023)	"Project Walls" (2023)

"Project Walls" is a song by American rapper Lil Tjay, released on July 7, 2023 as the second single from his third studio album 222 (2023). It features American rapper YoungBoy Never Broke Again. It was produced by Rvssian, Decster and Way9.

== Background ==
In an interview Million Dollaz Worth of Game, Lil Tjay stated one feature on 222, in particular, was special. He later told Complex he was referring to YoungBoy Never Broke Again's feature on "Project Walls".

== Composition ==
The song contains piano keys and "bass bombs" in production, with elements of trap and drill. The artists perform in melodic vocals with use of Auto-Tune, while lyrically reflecting on growing up in poverty.

== Critical reception ==
Alexander Cole of HotNewHipHop wrote "Moreover, NBA YoungBoy offers a nice touch to the song. His part matches Tjay's in terms of both energy and flow. However, it is still nice to have another voice join the mix of the track. Ultimately, Tjay is doing a formidable job of building hype for this album." Chris DeVille of Stereogum called it "sing-songy and warm".

== Charts ==
Chart performance for "Project Walls"
Chart (2023)	Peak position
New Zealand Hot Singles (RMNZ)	12
US Bubbling Under Hot 100 (Billboard)	9
US Hot R&B/Hip-Hop Songs (Billboard)	32
