= Goat (song) =

2018 single by Lil Tjay

Single by Lil Tjay

from the album F.N and True 2 Myself
- Released: December 21, 2018
- Length: 3:58
- Label: Columbia
- Songwriter(s): Tione Merritt; Alex Petit; Cedric Franklin Jr.
- Producer(s): CashMoneyAP; CedDidit

Lil Tjay singles chronology
"Long Time" (2018)	"Goat" (2018)	"Pa$to" (2018)

Music video
- "Goat" on YouTube

"Goat" is a song by American rapper Lil Tjay, released to streaming services on December 21, 2018. It is the third single from his EP F.N (2019) and debut studio album True 2 Myself (2019). The song was produced by CashMoneyAP and CedDidit.

== Composition ==
Like most of Lil Tjay's music, the style of the song has been likened to that of A Boogie wit da Hoodie. The lyrics find Tjay reflecting on the troubles he has overcome in his life.

== Certifications ==
Region	Certification	Certified units/sales
Canada (Music Canada)	Gold	40,000^{‡}
United States (RIAA)	Platinum	1,000,000^{‡}
^{‡} Sales+streaming figures based on certification alone.
