= One Take (song) =

2019 song by Lil Tjay

Song by Lil Tjay

from the album True 2 Myself
- Released: October 11, 2019
- Length: 2:48
- Label: Columbia
- Songwriter(s): Tione Merritt; Alphanso Cole
- Producer(s): ZiggyOnTheKeyboard

"One Take" is a song by American rapper Lil Tjay and the opening track from his debut studio album True 2 Myself (2019). It was produced by ZiggyOnTheKeyboard.

== Critical reception ==
Alphonse Pierre of Pitchfork wrote favorably of the song, describing it as "Tjay at his sharpest; every line over the sparkly keys has a purpose, especially when he addresses comparisons to fellow Bronx crooner A Boogie Wit Da Hoodie: 'They said I'm the new A Boogie, relax/I ain't never tried to copy his swag.'"

== Charts ==
Chart (2019)	Peak position
Canada (Canadian Hot 100)	81
US Bubbling Under Hot 100 Singles (Billboard)	12

== Certifications ==
Region	Certification	Certified units/sales
United States (RIAA)	Platinum	1,000,000^{‡}
^{‡} Sales+streaming figures based on certification alone.
