= Ruthless (song) =

2019 single by Lil Tjay featuring Jay Critch

Single by Lil Tjay featuring Jay Critch

from the album F.N and True 2 Myself
- Released: May 3, 2019
- Length: 4:04
- Label: Columbia
- Songwriters: Tione Merritt; Jason Critchlow; Gerail Harvey
- Producer: Relly Made

Lil Tjay singles chronology
| "Slide" (2019) | "Ruthless" (2019) | "From Nothing" (2019) |

Jay Critch singles chronology
| "Something Special" (2019) | "Ruthless" (2019) | "Don't @ Me" (2019) |

Music video
- "Ruthless" on YouTube

"Ruthless" is a song by American rapper Lil Tjay, released on May 3, 2019, as the fourth single from his EP F.N (2019) and debut studio album True 2 Myself (2019). The song features American rapper Jay Critch and was produced by Relly Made.

== Composition ==
The production is composed of piano, while lyrically Lil Tjay reflects on his life.

== Critical reception ==
Alphonse Pierre of Pitchfork commented that the song has "the perfect instrumental for Lil Tjay's light flow" and "Jay Critch trades his youth infused Fabolous-style delivery for a melody that sounds amateurish next to Tjay's, yet Critch's swag and personality sells the verse by the end."

== Certifications ==
Certifications for "Ruthless"
| Region | Certification | Certified units/sales |
|---|---|---|
| Canada (Music Canada) | Gold | 40,000^{‡} |
| United Kingdom (BPI) | Silver | 200,000^{‡} |
| United States (RIAA) | Platinum | 1,000,000^{‡} |
^{‡} Sales+streaming figures based on certification alone.
