= State of Emergency (Lil Tjay EP) =

EP by Lil Tjay
- Released: May 8, 2020
- Recorded: 2019–2020
- Genre: Hip hop; trap; drill; R&B
- Length: 22:36
- Label: Columbia
- Producer: 808Melo; AmDesp; AriaTheProducer; AXL Beats; BenzMuzik; Bordeaux; Great John; Non Native; RilBeatz; TYQUIL; Tweek Tune

Lil Tjay chronology
True 2 Myself (2019)	State of Emergency (2020)	Destined 2 Win (2021)

Singles from State of Emergency
- 1. "Ice Cold" Released: May 1, 2020

State of Emergency is the third extended play by American rapper Lil Tjay. It was released on May 8, 2020 by Columbia Records. The album features guest appearances from Fivio Foreign, Pop Smoke, Sheff G, Sleepy Hallow, J.I the Prince of N.Y, and Jay Gwuapo.

== Promotion ==
"Ice Cold" was released on May 1, 2020 as the lead single, alongside a music video.

The music video for "Zoo York" featuring Pop Smoke and Fivio Foreign was released on May 8, 2020.

== Critical reception ==
Pitchfork assigns 6.7/10 and says: "Across a mostly fun, guest-filled 22 minutes, the young New York rapper does what needs to be done and puts on for his city". It also explains how the name of the EP has nothing to do with the COVID-19 pandemic, but with the murder problems caused in New York. However he adds that the album created in too short a time and that 22 minutes are not enough to give a completely positive review.

== Track listing ==
Track listing and credits adapted from Spotify.

No.	Title	Producer(s)	Length
1.	"Ice Cold"	AmDesp; Tweek Tune; TYQUIL	3:20
2.	"Zoo York" (featuring Pop Smoke and Fivio Foreign)	Bordeaux; Non Native	3:35
3.	"Shoot for the Stars" (featuring Fivio Foreign)	AXL Beats	2:27
4.	"Wet Em Up Pt. 2" (with Sheff G and Sleepy Hallow)	Great John	3:12
5.	"City on My Back" (with Jay Critch)	RilBeatz; BenzMuzik	3:24
6.	"My City" (with J.I the Prince of N.Y)	AriaTheProducer	3:03
7.	"Gettin Lit" (with Jay Gwuapo)	808Melo	3:21
Total length:			22:36

== Charts ==
Chart performance for State of Emergency
Chart (2020)	Peak position
Belgian Albums (Ultratop Flanders)	155
Canadian Albums (Billboard)	19
Dutch Albums (Album Top 100)	77
Norwegian Albums (VG-lista)	31
UK Albums (OCC)	60
US Billboard 200	31
