= Brothers (Lil Tjay song) =

Single by Lil Tjay

Single by Lil Tjay

from the album F.N and True 2 Myself
- Released: July 9, 2018
- Length: 3:30
- Label: Columbia
- Songwriters: Tione Merritt; João Duarte; Demetrie Glover
- Producers: JD On Tha Track; Protegé Beatz

Lil Tjay singles chronology
"Goat" (2018)	"Brothers" (2018)	"Leaked" (2018)

Music video
- "Brothers" on YouTube

"Brothers" is a song by American rapper Lil Tjay, released on July 9, 2018. It amassed millions of streams on SoundCloud, becoming his breakout hit and leading to him signing with Columbia Records. The song appears on his debut studio album True 2 Myself (2019), which also features the official remix of the song featuring American rapper Lil Durk.

== Composition ==
The song finds Lil Tjay sing-rapping about his earlier life and experience, including growing up on the streets and grave subjects such as death and being incarcerated ("Caught a felony, judge tried to slave me / Lost my grandmother, R.I.P. Mavy").

== Charts ==
Chart (2019)	Peak position
Canada Hot 100 (Billboard)	99
US Bubbling Under Hot 100 (Billboard)	14
US Bubbling Under R&B/Hip-Hop Singles (Billboard)	7

== Certifications ==
Region	Certification	Certified units/sales
Canada (Music Canada)	Platinum	80,000^{‡}
United Kingdom (BPI)	Silver	200,000^{‡}
United States (RIAA)	3× Platinum	3,000,000^{‡}
^{‡} Sales+streaming figures based on certification alone.
