= 222 (album) =

Studio album by Lil Tjay
- Released: July 14, 2023
- Length: 46:19
- Label: Columbia
- Producers: A Lau; Andy Ayaz; Andyr; Ari PenSmith; Bak; Ben Heet; Bizness Boi; Bordeaux; Boston; Decster; Desirez Beats; Drü Oliver; Emrld Beats; Fasbeats; Geo Vocals; G. Ry; Harry East; Indyah; IOF; Itamar Gov-Ari; Jackum; Jahaan Sweet; JPBeatz; KBeaZy; K Hendrix; KXVI; Lala the DJ; LavishBeatz; LMC; Marco Bernardis; MesioMusic; Mike Wavvs; Non Native; OBMusic; OG Parker; P2J; Pat McManus; Rvssian; Savant; SephGotTheWaves; Smash David; Sool Got Hits; TwixBeats; Venna; VVS Melody; Way9

Lil Tjay chronology
Destined 2 Win (2021)	222 (2023)	Farewell (2024)

Singles from 222
- 1. "June 22nd" Released: June 22, 2023; 2. "Project Walls" Released: July 7, 2023

Professional ratings
Review scores
Source	Rating
HipHopDX	3.4/5
AllMusic	2.5/5 stars

222 is the third studio album by American rapper Lil Tjay. It was released on July 14, 2023, through Columbia Records. This serves as the follow-up to his 2021 album Destined 2 Win. The production on the album was handled by multiple producers including Ari PenSmith, Jahaan Sweet, OG Parker, P2J, and Smash David among others. The album also features guest appearances from Coco Jones, Fivio Foreign, Jadakiss, the Kid Laroi, Polo G, Summer Walker, and YoungBoy Never Broke Again.

222 was supported by two singles: "June 22nd" and "Project Walls" featuring YoungBoy Never Broke Again.

== Background ==
Lil Tjay began to tease the project in early 2022, however, the release of the project was indefinitely pushed back due to Tjay being shot seven times on June 22, 2022. On June 22, 2023, alongside the release of the first single, "June 22nd", Tjay officially announced the album and its release date of July 14, 2023. Two weeks following the announcement, Tjay announce the album's official tracklist, building anticipation due to the list of features on the project.

== Singles ==
The album's lead single, "June 22nd" was released on June 22, 2023, to streaming services, along with its music video. The album's second single "Project Walls" featuring YoungBoy Never Broke Again was released on July 7, 2023, just a week prior to the release of the complete album.

== Track listing ==
222 track listing
No.	Title	Writer(s)	Producer(s)	Length
1.	"Nightshift"	Tione Merritt; Luis Bordeaux; Ryan Martinez; Brendan Walsh; Samuel David Jimenez; Ariowa Irosogie; Richard Isong; Malik Venna; Jack Nichols-Marcy; Marco Bernadis	Bordeaux; G. Ry; Non Native; Smash David; Ari PenSmith^{[a]}; P2J^{[a]}; Venna^{[a]}; Jackum^{[a]}; Marco Bernardis^{[a]}	3:08
2.	"June 22nd"	Merritt; Adrian Lau; Andrew Oliver; Evan Ellicott; Indyah McAlister; Itamar Gov-Ari; Liam McAlister	A Lau; Drü Oliver; Emrld Beats; Indyah; Itamar Gov-Ari; LMC	3:10
3.	"Nobody"	Merritt; Ben Heet; Lau; Oliver; Daniela Voznesensky; Douglas Gibbs; Ralph Johnson	Ben Heet; A Lau^{[b]}; Drü Oliver^{[b]}; Lala the DJ^{[b]}	3:04
4.	"Scared 2 Be Lonely"	Merritt; Andre Robertson; Fedor Sommerfeld; Georgia Boyden; Michael Washington Jr.; Florian Thi Nguyen Van; Daniel Way	Bizness Boi^{[a]}; Fasbeats; Geo Vocals; Mike Wavvs^{[a]}; VVS Melody; Way9	3:02
5.	"Stressed" (featuring Summer Walker)	Merritt; Summer Walker; Chancelor Bennett; Kehlani Parrish; Jahaan Sweet; Keegan Bach; Kavi Lybarger; Oliver Larsson; Andrew Decena; Ian Viitala	Jahaan Sweet; KBeaZy; KXVI; LavishBeatz; JPBeatz	2:24
6.	"2 Grown" (featuring the Kid Laroi)	Merritt; Charlton Howard; Nguyen Van; Margaret Chapman; Luke Niccoli; Ashley Kutcher	VVS Melody	3:52
7.	"Heart Felt Soul"	Merritt; Kevin Webb; Daniel Melika; Shaun Cooper	K Hendrix; Savant; TwixBeats	2:35
8.	"Bla Bla" (featuring Fivio Foreign)	Merritt; Maxie Ryles III; Lau; Bordeaux; Gov-Ari; Walsh	A Lau; Bordeaux; Gov-Ari; Non Native	2:26
9.	"Someone Who Cares"	Merritt; Martinez; MesioMusic; Rasool Diaz	G. Ry; MesioMusic^{[b]}; Sool Got Hits^{[b]}	3:23
10.	"Forgot I Was the 1?"	Merritt; Lau; Robertson; Bordeaux; Andrew Oliver; Demetri Fincher; Cristian Tejada; Walsh; Oritseniraro Bemigho-Amorighoye	A Lau; Bizness Boi; Bordeaux; Drü Oliver^{[b]}; Harry East^{[a]}; Non Native; OBMusic	3:32
11.	"Hole in My Heart" (featuring Jadakiss)	Merritt; Jason Phillips; Andrej Marko; Martinez; Walsh; Joseph Boyden	Andyr; G. Ry^{[c]}; Non Native^{[c]}; SephGotTheWaves	3:12
12.	"Project Walls" (featuring YoungBoy Never Broke Again)	Merritt; Kentrell Gaulden; Declan Roberts; Tarik Johnston; Way	Decster; Rvssian; Way9	2:32
13.	"Beat the Odds Pt 2" (featuring Polo G)	Merritt; Taurus Bartlett; Desirez Beats; Kavi Lybarger; Brooderick Blanc; Bach	Desirez Beats; KBeaZy; KXVI	3:32
14.	"Foster Baby"	Merritt; Lau; Andrew Ayaz; Alexander Bak; Nikolaos Grivellas; Martinez; Michael McCall; Joshua Isaih Parker; Pat McManus	A Lau^{[a]}; Andy Ayaz^{[a]}; Bak^{[a]}; Boston; G. Ry; IOF; OG Parker; Pat McManus	3:33
15.	"Grateful" (featuring Coco Jones)	Merritt; Courtney Jones; Lau; Robertson; Gov-Ari; Washington; Francis Leblanc	A Lau; Bizness Boi^{[c]}; Gov-Ari; Mike Wavvs^{[c]}	2:48
Total length:				45:14

Notes

- ^{^[a]} signifies an uncredited co-producer.
- ^{^[b]} signifies a co-producer
- ^{^[c]} signifies an additional co-producer

Sample credits

- "Stressed" samples "The Way" by Kehlani featuring Chance the Rapper.
- "Nobody" samples "Song Cry" by Jay-Z.

== Personnel ==
Musicians

- Lil Tjay – vocals (tracks 1–15)
- Itamar Gov-Ari – piano (3), guitar (10)
- Misha Ellis – violin (3)
- Geo Vocals – additional vocals (4)
- Summer Walker – vocals (5)
- Kehlani – additional vocals (5)
- The Kid Laroi – vocals (6)
- Ashley Kutcher – additional vocals (6)
- Fivio Foreign – vocals (8)
- IAM3AM – additional vocals (10)
- Jadakiss – vocals (11)
- YoungBoy Never Broke Again – vocals (12)
- Polo G – vocals (13)
- Coco Jones – vocals (15)
- Sunday Service Choir – additional vocals (15)

Technical

- Eric Lagg – mastering (1)
- Chris Gehringer – mastering (2–15)
- Robert Soukiasyan – mixing (1–15)
- Barrington Hall – recording (1, 4–10, 12–14)
- Raymond Kelly – recording (2, 3, )
- Bordeaux – recording (8, 15)
- Drü Oliver – recording (10)
- Robert Soukiasyan – recording (11)
- Jason "Cheese" Goldberg – mastering, mixing, recording (12)
- Frankie Ruggs – recording (15)

== Charts ==
Chart performance for 222
Chart (2023)	Peak position
Australian Albums (ARIA)	41
Austrian Albums (Ö3 Austria)	30
Belgian Albums (Ultratop Flanders)	47
Belgian Albums (Ultratop Wallonia)	107
Canadian Albums (Billboard)	15
Danish Albums (Hitlisten)	19
Dutch Albums (Album Top 100)	35
French Albums (SNEP)	101
German Albums (Offizielle Top 100)	50
Irish Albums (IRMA)	38
New Zealand Albums (RMNZ)	16
Norwegian Albums (VG-lista)	35
Swiss Albums (Schweizer Hitparade)	15
UK Albums (Official Charts)	26
US Billboard 200	24
US Top R&B/Hip-Hop Albums (Billboard)	9
