= Valentino (24kGoldn song) =

2019 song by 24kGoldn

Single by 24kGoldn

from the album Dropped Outta College
- Released: January 25, 2019
- Genre: Pop; trap; emo rap
- Length: 3:00
- Label: Records; Columbia
- Songwriters: Golden Von Jones; Kevin Essett
- Producer: BlackMayo

24kGoldn singles chronology
"Ballin' Like Shareef" (2018)	"Valentino" (2019)	"Time for That" (2019)

Music video
- "Valentino" on YouTube

"Valentino" is a song by American rapper 24kGoldn, released on January 25, 2019. It is the lead single from his debut EP Dropped Outta College, and was produced by BlackMayo. The song, which is about 24kGoldn wanting money and valuable possessions over love, went viral on TikTok. Considered his breakout hit, it became his first song to chart on the Billboard Hot 100, peaking at 92. On January 3, 2020, a remix of the song featuring American rapper Lil Tjay was released. And on June 11, 2020, another remix featuring production from Kazakh DJ Imanbek, was released.

== Charts ==
Chart performance for "Valentino"
Chart (2019)	Peak position
Canada Hot 100 (Billboard)	38
Latvia (LAIPA)	17
US Billboard Hot 100	92
US Hot R&B/Hip-Hop Songs (Billboard)	42
US Rhythmic Airplay (Billboard)	31

== Certifications ==
Certifications for "Valentino"
Region	Certification	Certified units/sales
Canada (Music Canada)	4× Platinum	320,000^{‡}
Denmark (IFPI Danmark)	Gold	45,000^{‡}
Hungary (MAHASZ)	2× Platinum	8,000^{‡}
New Zealand (RMNZ)	Platinum	30,000^{‡}
Poland (ZPAV)	Gold	25,000^{‡}
Portugal (AFP)	Gold	5,000^{‡}
United Kingdom (BPI)	Silver	200,000^{‡}
United States (RIAA)	2× Platinum	2,000,000^{‡}
^{‡} Sales+streaming figures based on certification alone.
