= Kay Flock =

American rapper (born 2003)

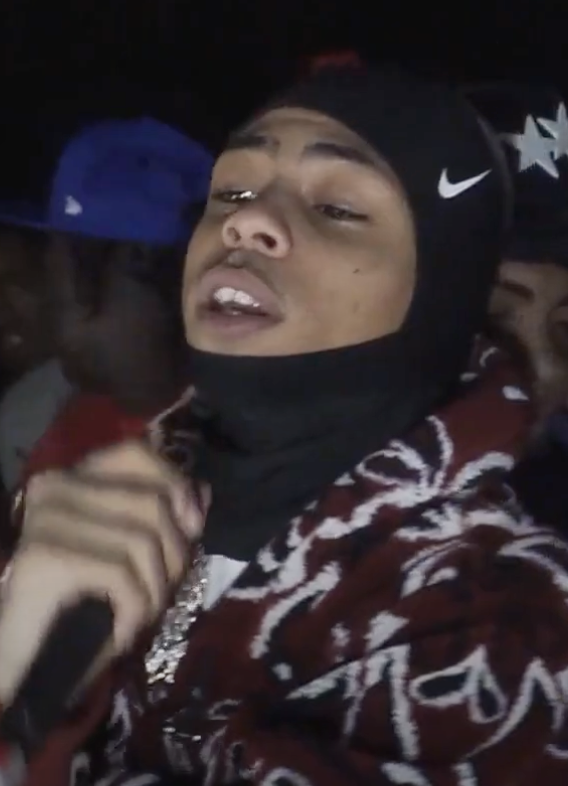
- Kay Flock performing in 2021

Background information
- Born: Kevin Perez; April 20, 2003 (age 23); Belmont, Bronx, New York City, U.S.
- Genres: Hip hop; drill
- Occupation: Rapper
- Years active: 2020–2025
- Label: Capitol
- Website: kayflockmusic.com
- Criminal information
- Status: Incarcerated
- Criminal charge: Attempted murder Racketeering
- Penalty: 30 years imprisonment

Details
- Date apprehended: March 20, 2025
- Imprisoned at: USP Florence High, Florence, Colorado U.S.

Kevin Perez (born April 20, 2003), known professionally as Kay Flock, is an American rapper. Hailing from the Bronx, he began his career in 2020 and rose to fame through a variety of singles, most notably "Shake It". He released his debut mixtape, The D.O.A. Mix tape in 2021.

== Early life ==
Perez was born on April 20, 2003, in the Bronx, New York City; he is half Dominican and Puerto Rican. He later described the area he grew up in as "dangerous". Perez‘s half brother on his father's side is fellow Bronx drill rapper JoWvttz, named Johnny Hernandez.

== Career ==
Kay Flock began his music career in May 2020, issuing his first single, "FTO"; other songs that he released following this included "Opp Spotter" (featuring B-Lovee), "Brotherly Love" (featuring B-Lovee and Dougie B) and "PSA".

Kay Flock released his debut mixtape, The D.O.A. Tape, on November 5, 2021, which peaked at number one on the Heatseekers charts. In August, he released "Is Ya Ready"; the song was named within journalist Jon Caramanica's top 28 songs of 2021. He later released "Being Honest", which samples "Changes" by XXXTentacion. The song was said to be "reminiscent of G Herbo" and was named within Pitchfork's top 38 rap songs of 2021 and top 100 songs of 2021. A remix of the song, featuring G Herbo, was released in November.

In October, he was featured on "Not in the Mood" by Lil Tjay, which also featured Fivio Foreign. The song peaked at number 61 on the Billboard Hot 100. In November, Kay Flock was named Billboard's Hip Hop Rookie of the Month. During an interview with XXL, he stated that his style of rapping was compared to King Von and Pop Smoke, with Asian Doll saying that Von would have been a fan of Kay Flock.

In April 2022, Kay Flock released "Shake It" with Dougie B and Cardi B, featuring Bory300; it peaked at number 51 on the Billboard Hot 100. The track was leaked months prior, although the leaked version of the song featured Yonkers rapper Mula Gzz, whose verse was replaced with Cardi’s.

== Personal life ==
He endorsed Donald Trump's 2024 presidential campaign.

=== Legal issues ===
When Perez was 15, he was charged with third-degree robbery and received one year probation.

On November 12, 2021, Perez was arrested for having an illegal weapon (gun), but the case has never been adjudicated, thus, no charges were ever filed.

On December 23, 2021, Perez was arrested after allegedly shooting and killing 24-year-old Oscar Hernandez, also known as OY Wasca and/or Honcho, in Manhattan, Harlem, New York. According to the New York Police Department, on December 16, 2021, as Perez walked past a barbershop near the scene of the crime, Hernandez ran out of the shop before allegedly being shot in the neck and back by Perez. Hernandez later died from his injuries at Mount Sinai Hospital. After Perez was named as the main suspect in the investigation, he turned himself in to the NYPD on December 23, 2021. He was sent to Rikers Island and was held without bond.

On February 23, 2023, Perez and seven others were federally indicted on racketeering charges, with federal law enforcement also picking up his murder case. He is currently facing federal first-degree murder charges, attempted murder allegedly taking place on November 10, 2021, and racketeering charges in relation to the Sevside/DOA crew and was moved from Rikers Island to a federal prison pending trial. Perez was initially facing the death penalty, but on July 31, 2023, the US government said they would no longer seek the death penalty in his case.

Perez is the only defendant in the indictment who has not entered into a plea agreement with the Government. He took it to trial, which started March 10, 2025. If he were found guilty on all charges, he faced mandatory life in prison.

On March 20, 2025, Perez was convicted of attempted murder and racketeering charges linked to the Sevside/DOA gang. However, he was acquitted of the murder charge of Oscar Hernandez after the jury accepted his self-defense claim. The sentencing for the remaining convictions was scheduled for December 16, 2025, with Perez facing a minimum of 10 years and a maximum sentence of life in prison; prosecutors asked for a fifty-year sentence. On December 16, 2025, Perez was sentenced to 30 years in prison on racketeering and attempted murder charges. He is currently incarcerated at USP Florence High, Florence, Colorado.

== Discography ==
=== Mixtapes ===
List of mixtapes, with selected details and chart positions
Title	Mixtape details	Peak chart positions
Title	Mixtape details	US Heat
The D.O.A. Tape	Released: November 5, 2021; Label: Capitol Records; Format: CD, digital download, streaming	3

=== Singles ===
==== As lead artist ====
List of singles as lead artist, showing year released and album name
Title	Year	Peak chart positions			Certifications	Album
Title	Year	US	US R&B/HH	NZ Hot	Certifications	Album
"FTO"	2020	—	—	—		The D.O.A. Tape (Care Package)
"Opp Spotter" (with B-Lovee)	2020	—	—	—		The D.O.A. Tape
"Speed Racing" (with B-Lovee)	2020	—	—	—		The D.O.A. Tape
"Brotherly Love" (with B-Lovee and Dougie B)	2021	—	—	—		The D.O.A. Tape
"T Cardi" (with Dougie B, Lil Skrap 1090 and Justo B)	2021	—	—	—		The D.O.A. Tape
"Being Honest"	2021	—	—	—	RIAA: Gold	The D.O.A. Tape
"Is Ya Ready"	2021	—	—	—	RIAA: Gold	The D.O.A. Tape
"PSA"	2021	—	—	—	RIAA: Platinum	The D.O.A. Tape
"Being Honest (Remix)" (with G Herbo)	2021	— (Note: "Being Honest (Remix)" did not enter the Billboard Hot 100, but peaked at number 24 on the Bubbling Under Hot 100 chart.)	—	—		The D.O.A. Tape
"Shake It" (with Dougie B and Cardi B, featuring Bory300)	2022	51	14	9	RIAA: Platinum	The D.O.A. Tape (Care Package)
"Make a Movie" (featuring Fivio Foreign)	2022	—	—	—		The D.O.A. Tape (Care Package)
"Brotherly Love (Pt. 2)" (featuring B-Lovee and Dougie B)	2022	—	—	—		The D.O.A. Tape (Care Package)
"DOA" (featuring Set Da Trend)	2022	—	—	—		The D.O.A. Tape (Care Package)
"Geeked Up" (with Gucci Mane)	2022	—	—	—		The D.O.A. Tape (Care Package)

==== As featured artist ====
Title	Year	Peak chart positions		Album
Title	Year	US	US R&B/HH	Album
"Not in the Mood" (Lil Tjay featuring Fivio Foreign and Kay Flock)	2021	61	22	Non-album single
