= Not in the Mood =

2021 single by Lil Tjay featuring Fivio Foreign and Kay Flock

Single by Lil Tjay featuring Fivio Foreign and Kay Flock
- Released: October 22, 2021
- Genre: Drill
- Length: 2:30
- Label: Columbia
- Songwriters: Tione Merritt; Maxie Ryles III; Kevin Perez; BS Beats; Aswad Asif
- Producers: BS Beats; AyoAA

Lil Tjay singles chronology
"Feel Good (Remix)" (2021)	"Not in the Mood" (2021)	"Doctor" (2021)

Fivio Foreign singles chronology
"LMB" (2021)	"Not in the Mood" (2021)	"Panicking" (2021)

Kay Flock singles chronology
"Everybody K" (2021)	"Not in the Mood" (2021)	"Being Honest (Remix)" (2021)

Music video
- "Not in the Mood" on YouTube

"Not in the Mood" is a song by American rapper Lil Tjay featuring fellow American rappers Fivio Foreign and Kay Flock. Written alongside producers BS Beats and AyoAA, it was released as a single on October 22, 2021.

== Composition ==
"Not in the Mood" is a drill song that sees the artists rapping about their determination to work harder and "overcome life's obstacles", as well as their lifestyles and street life.

== Music video ==
The music video, released alongside the single, was filmed in New York. In it, the rappers and their respective crews appear in the studio, outside apartments and on the streets of Times Square.

== Charts ==
Chart performance for "Not in the Mood"
Chart (2021)	Peak position
Canada Hot 100 (Billboard)	35
Global 200 (Billboard)	92
Ireland (IRMA)	98
New Zealand Hot Singles (RMNZ)	9
UK Singles (Official Charts)	75
US Billboard Hot 100	61
US Hot R&B/Hip-Hop Songs (Billboard)	22
US Rolling Stone Top 100	42

== Certifications ==
Certifications for "Not in the Mood"
Region	Certification	Certified units/sales
United States (RIAA)	Gold	500,000^{‡}
^{‡} Sales+streaming figures based on certification alone.
