= Jay Critch =

American rapper

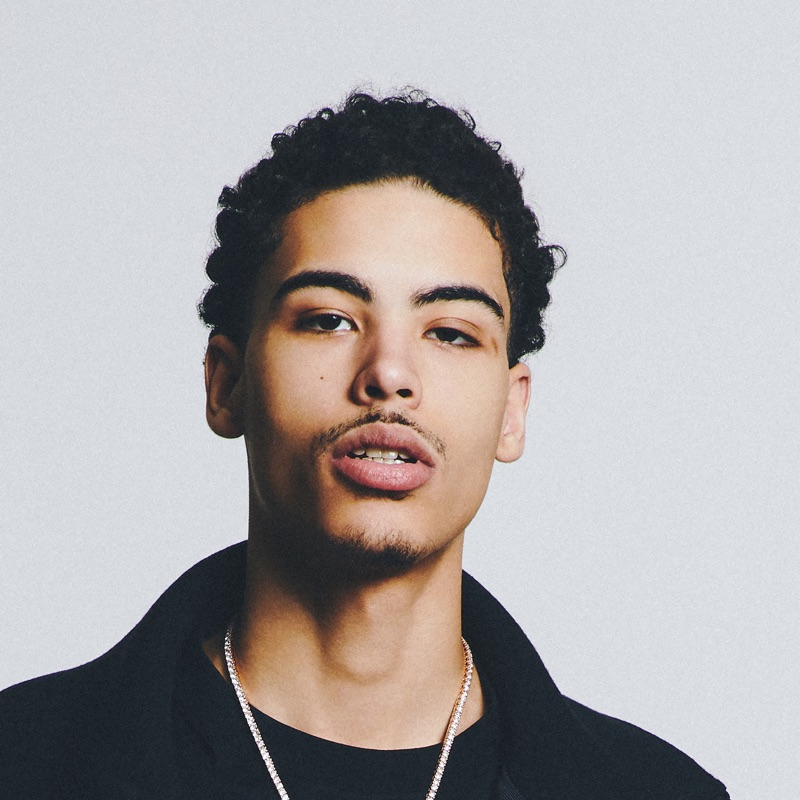
- Critchlow in 2018

Background information
- Born: Jason Cole Critchlow; February 25, 1998 (age 28); Brooklyn, New York City, U.S.
- Genres: East Coast hip-hop; trap
- Occupations: Rapper; singer; songwriter
- Years active: 2015–present
- Labels: Talk Money; Interscope; 300; Rich Forever; EMPIRE

Jason Cole Critchlow (born February 25, 1998), known professionally as Jay Critch, is an American rapper from Brooklyn, New York City. He signed with Rich the Kid's record label, Rich Forever Music, in 2016, and first gained recognition from his collaborations with the rapper. Released in a joint venture with Interscope Records, his debut solo mixtape, Hood Favorite (2018), entered the Billboard 200, along with two of his compilation albums with the former label: Rich Forever 3 (2017) and Rich Forever 4 (2019).

== Early life ==
Jason Cole Critchlow was born on February 25, 1998 in the Clinton Hill neighborhood of Brooklyn, New York City, to a Trinidadian mother and a British-Guyanese father. As a child, he was fascinated by listening to his older brother rap. Critch grew up listening to Fabolous, Lil Wayne, and Jay-Z, as well as other rappers from his hometown.

== Career ==
Jay Critch's first major collaboration was with Rowdy Rebel on the song "Man Down" in 2015. In 2016, he began uploading songs on SoundCloud. He became the subject of widespread attention in 2016, when his song "Did It Again" was remixed by Rich the Kid, who signed him to Rich Forever Music in November. Their collaboration went viral, with the music video gaining over a million views in the first week of its release.

In November 2018, as a newly signed artist, Jay Critch released his debut solo mixtape, Hood Favorite. It features guest appearances from Offset, French Montana and Fabolous. He also was featured on Lil Tjay's "Ruthless", which was certified platinum.

In December 2020, Jay Critch released his third mixtape, Signed with Love.

On May 5, 2021, Jay returned with his mixtape, Critch Tape. Announced just hours before its release, the project contains 23 songs, with features from Fivio Foreign, Lil Tjay, and Drakeo the Ruler, among others.

== Discography ==
=== Mixtapes ===
List of mixtapes, with release date and selected chart position
Title	Mixtape details	Peak chart positions	
Title	Mixtape details	US	US R&B/HH
Rich Forever 3 (with Rich the Kid and Famous Dex)	Released: June 16, 2017; Label: Rich Forever Music, 300 Entertainment; Format: Digital download, streaming	93	42
Hood Favorite	Released: November 2, 2018; Label: Rich Forever Music, Interscope Records	86	47
Rich Forever 4 (with Rich the Kid and Famous Dex)	Released: August 2, 2019; Label: Rich Forever Music, 300 Entertainment; Format: Digital download, streaming	170	—
Signed with Love	Released: December 22, 2020; Label: Talk Money Entertainment, EMPIRE; Format: Digital download, streaming	—	—
Critch Tape	Released: May 5, 2021; Label: Talk Money Entertainment, EMPIRE; Format: Digital download, streaming	—	—
Jugg Season	Released: February 17, 2023; Label: Talk Money Entertainment, EMPIRE; Format: Digital download, streaming	—	—
"—" denotes a recording that did not chart or was not released in that territory.

=== Singles ===
- Man Down (with Rowdy Rebel) (2016)
- Scoop (2016)
- Take Sumn (2016)
- Hennything (2016)
- FIFA (featuring Dami) (2016)
- Affiliated (2016)
- Talk About (with Rich the Kid) (2017)
- Still Sippin (with Rich the Kid) (2017)
- Did it Again (with Rich the Kid) (2017)
- Rich Forever Outro (with Rich the Kid and Famous Dex) (2017)
- Pull Up (with Famous Dex) (2017)
- Started It (featuring Don Q) (2017)
- Do the Math (with Rich the Kid) (2017)
- Pretty as f*ck (with Splash Gordan and Zeus Blanco) (2017)
- In & Out (2017)
- Family Rich (featuring Skinnyfromthe9) (2017)
- Speak Up (2017)
- Bottom Line (2017)
- HIT (with Desiigner) (2017)
- Red and Blue (with Vendetta) (2017)
- Get Bucks (2017)
- Yoshi (2017)
- Rockets (2017)
- Driving me Brazy (2017)
- Adlibs (2017)
- Wassup wit the Bag (featuring Larssen and Ski Mask the Slump God) (2017)
- Fashion (with Rich the Kid) (2017)
- Thousand Ways (with Harry Fraud) (2017)
- Make it Count (with Lil Dude) (2018)
- Ego (2018)
- Big 30 (2018)
- Sweepstakes (2018)
- Gotta Go (Remix) (featuring A-D and Kalem) (2018)
- Bluff (2018)
- Still Sippin (Remix) (with Rich the Kid featuring Prince Don) (2018)
- Now a Days (with King Ceazar) (2018)
- Change Clothes (with Bronx Twins) (2018)
- Robin Hood (2018)
- Knots (featuring wifisfuneral) (2018)
- Wanna Ball (featuring Flipp Dinero) (2018)
- Nervous (featuring Rich the Kid, Famous Dex and Lil Baby) (2018)
- Ice (featuring Marty Baller, ASAP Ferg, Rich the Kid and Sfera Ebbasta) (2018)
- Cable Guy (featuring Key and Kenny Beats) (2018)
- Oh Wow (with Rich the Kid) (2018)
- Brown Hair (2019)
- Stimulate (featuring Buckee) (2019)
- Ruthless (Lil Tjay featuring Jay Critch) (2019)
- Count me Up (with TMK) (2019)
- Messy (2019)
- Wendy's (2019)
- 6ix Rings (2019)
- One 2 (with Pi'erre Bourne) (2019)
- Don't @ Me (2019)
- Adlibs Part 2 (2019)
- Something Special (2019)
- Necklace (with AJ Tracey) (2019)
- Bully (2019)
- Party Bus (with Rich the Kid and Famous Dex) (2019)
- I'm a Star (Madden NFL 20) (2019)
- Cameras (featuring Nick Mira & jetsonmade) (2019)
- Dreams in a Wraith (2019)
- Spooky (2020)
- Money Talk (with Tony Seltzer and A Lau) (2020)
- Handlin' Business (featuring WoBandz) (2020)
- Bronny (2020)
- Mighty Ducks (2020)
- The Line Up (2020)
- GameStop (2020)
- Outside (with Slayter) (2020)
- Hoes Fav (with Laron) (2020)
- Devastated (with Laron) (2020)
- Execute (with Tank God) (2020)
- Back End (with Laron) (2020)
- Living Good (with Laron) (2020)
- Overseas (with Mad Clip and Mike G) (2021)
- Go Wherever (2021)
- PC (2021)
- To the Sky (2021)
- Built for this (2021)
- Hustler Muzik (2021)
- Stretch (2021)
- Jack It (2021)
- Headlines (2021)
- Gifted (2021)
- Deadline (2021)
- Losses (with Slayter) (2021)
- Talk (2021)
- KD Freestyle (2022)
- Buck 50 Freestyle (2022)
- Drank in my Cup (2022)
- At my worst (2022)
- Spin no blocks (2022)
- Stamped (2022)
- Anyday (2022)
- Sade (2022)
- Close to me / Active (2022)
- Up All Night (2022)
- Rose Gold (with Yung Lano) (2022)
- Play This At My Funeral (2022)
- Cheating Freestyle (2022)
- Spooky Freestyle (2022)
- Click (2022)
- Born with it (with Harry Fraud) (2022)
- Lefty (with Rich the Kid) (2022)
- Where's Dexter (with Rich the Kid and Famous Dex) (2023)
- Oh What a feeling (2023)
- Oops (with mssha) (2023)
- Still Movin (with Rich the Kid and Fivio Foreign) (2023)
- Google Maps (2023)
- Homesick (2023)
- Big Dawg (with Rich the Kid and Famous Dex) (2023)
- Rich & Reckless (with Rich the Kid and Famous Dex) (2024)
- Too Rare (2024)
- Loopy (2024)
- Leech (2024)
- All U Need to Know (2024)
- Italian & London (featuring Derek Luccas and Marreta) (2024)
