= Rich the Kid discography =

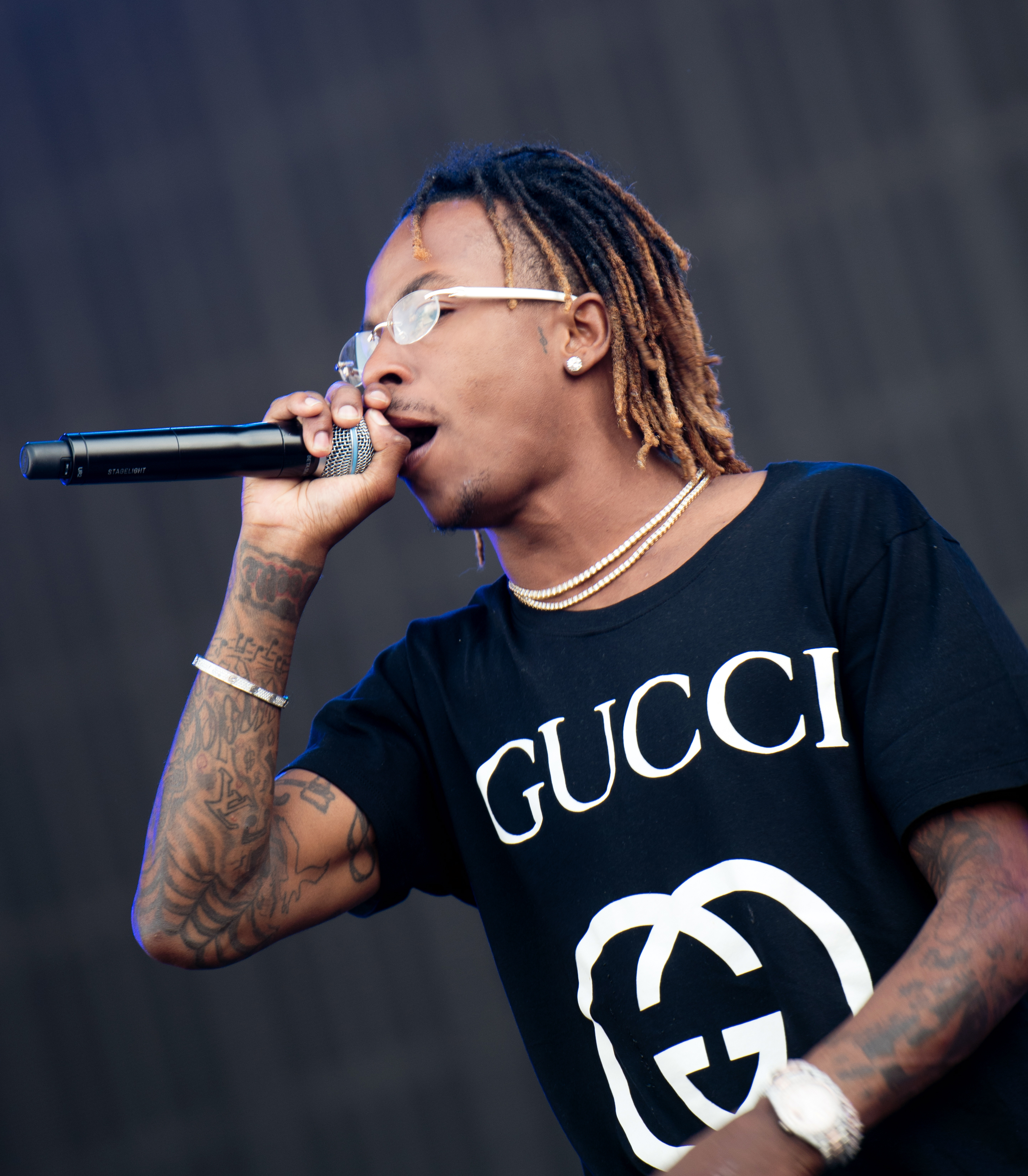
- Rich the Kid performing in 2019
- Studio albums: 4
- EPs: 3
- Compilation albums: 1
- Singles: 100+
- Mixtapes: 7
- Collaborative mixtapes: 15

The discography of American rapper Rich the Kid consists of four studio albums, 7 mixtapes, 15 collaborative mixtapes, 3 extended plays, 1 compilation album and 100+ singles (including 14 as a featured artist).

His debut studio album, The World Is Yours, released on March 30, 2018, supported by his hit singles "New Freezer" and "Plug Walk". His second studio album, The World Is Yours 2, was released on March 22, 2019, and his third studio album, Boss Man, on March 13, 2020.

== Albums ==
=== Studio albums ===
List of studio albums, showing selected details
| Title | Album details | Peak chart positions | | | | | | | | | | Certifications |
| Title | Album details | US | US R&B /HH | US Rap | AUS | CAN | DEN | NZ | SWE | SWI | UK | Certifications |
|---|---|---|---|---|---|---|---|---|---|---|---|---|
| The World Is Yours | Released: March 30, 2018; Label: Rich Forever, Interscope; Formats: CD, digital download, streaming | 2 | 2 | 2 | — | 3 | 20 | 20 | 27 | 21 | 25 | RIAA: Platinum; MC: Gold |
| The World Is Yours 2 | Released: March 22, 2019; Label: Rich Forever, Interscope; Formats: CD, LP, digital download, streaming | 4 | 3 | 3 | 33 | 5 | 39 | 23 | — | 33 | 42 | |
| Boss Man | Released: March 13, 2020; Label: Republic; Formats: CD, digital download, streaming | 24 | 17 | 14 | — | 28 | — | — | — | — | — | |
| Life's a Gamble | Released: July 19, 2024; Label: RTK, Gamma; Formats: CD, digital download, streaming | — | — | — | — | — | — | — | — | — | — | |
"—" denotes a recording that did not chart or was not released in that territory.

=== Compilation albums ===
List of compilation albums, with selected details
| Title | Album details |
|---|---|
| Best of Rich the Kid | Released: 2014; Label: Rich the Kid Productions; Format: Digital download |

== Extended plays ==
List of extended plays, with selected details
| Title | EP details |
|---|---|
| Rich the Sh*t | Released: May 15, 2016; Label: Sinatra; Format: Digital download |
| Avocado (Remixes) (with Charlette Devaney) | Released: April 20, 2018; Label: Rich Forever; Format: Digital download |
| Lucky 7 | Released: January 29, 2021; Label: Rich Forever, Empire; Format: Digital download |

== Mixtapes ==
List of mixtapes with details
| Title | Mixtape details |
|---|---|
| Been About the Benjamins | Released: March 1, 2013; Hosted by Trap-A-Holics, DJ Holiday & DJ Victoriouz; Label: Rich Forever; Format: Digital download |
| Feels Good to Be Rich | Released: August 14, 2014; Hosted by DJ Scream; Label: Rich Forever, Quality Control; Format: Digital download |
| Rich Than Famous | Released: December 25, 2014; Label: Rich Forever, Quality Control; Format: Digital download |
| Flexin' On Purpose | Released: August 31, 2015; Label: Rich Forever, Quality Control; Format: Digital download |
| Dabbin' Fever | Released: December 24, 2015; Label: Rich Forever, Quality Control; Format: Digital download |
| Trap Talk | Released: April 19, 2016; Label: Rich Forever, Quality Control; Format: Digital download |
| Keep Flexin' | Released: October 31, 2016; Label: Rich Forever, Quality Control; Format: Digital download |

=== Collaborative mixtapes ===
List of collaborative mixtapes with details
| Title | Mixtape details | Peak chart positions | | |
| Title | Mixtape details | US | US R&B/HH | US Rap |
|---|---|---|---|---|
| Streets On Lock (with Migos) | Released: August 3, 2013; Hosted by Cory B, DJ Ray G & DJ Victoriouz; Label: Rich Forever, Migo Gang; Format: Digital download | — | — | — |
| Streets On Lock 2 (with Migos) | Released: October 1, 2013; Hosted by DJ Kash, DJ Ray G, and DJ Victoriouz; Label: Rich Forever, Quality Control; Format: Digital download | — | — | — |
| Lobby Runners (with PeeWee Longway, Young Thug & Migos) | Released: December 25, 2013; Label: MPA Bandcamp, YSL, Rich Forever, Quality Control; Format: Digital download | — | — | — |
| Solid Foundation (with Quality Control Music) | Released: February 2, 2014; Hosted by DJ Drama; Label: Quality Control; Format: Digital download | — | — | — |
| Streets On Lock 3 (with Migos) | Released: April 20, 2014; Hosted by Trap-A-Holics, DJ Ray G, DJ Lil Keem, and DJ Kash; Label: Rich Forever, Quality Control; Format: Digital download | — | — | — |
| Still On Lock (with Migos) | Released: May 19, 2015; Label: YRN, Rich Forever, Quality Control; Format: Digital download | — | — | — |
| Streets On Lock 4 (with Migos) | Released: October 22, 2015; Hosted By DJ Durel; Label: YRN, Rich Forever, Quality Control; Format: Digital download | — | — | — |
| Whip It (with iLoveMakonnen) | Released: November 26, 2015; Label: Rich Forever, Quality Control, OVO; Format: Digital download | — | — | — |
| Rich Forever Music (with Rich Forever Music) | Released: April 4, 2016; Label: Rich Forever, Quality Control, 300; Format: Digital download, streaming | — | — | — |
| Rich Forever 2 (with Rich Forever Music) | Released: July 4, 2016; Label: Rich Forever, Quality Control, 300; Format: Digital download, streaming | — | — | — |
| The Rich Forever Way (with Rich Forever Music) | Released: March 17, 2017; Label: Rich Forever; Format: Digital download, streaming | — | — | — |
| Rich Forever 3 (with Rich Forever Music) | Released: June 26, 2017; Label: Rich Forever, 300; Format: Digital download, streaming | 93 | 42 | — |
| Rich Forever 4 (with Rich Forever Music) | Released: August 2, 2019; Label: Rich Forever, 300; Format: Digital download, streaming | 170 | — | — |
| Nobody Safe (with YoungBoy Never Broke Again) | Released: November 20, 2020; Label: Rich Forever, Never Broke Again, Empire; Format: LP, digital download, streaming | 43 | 21 | 19 |
| Trust Fund Babies (with Lil Wayne) | Released: October 1, 2021; Label: Rostrum, Young Money, Republic; Formats: Digital download, streaming | 35 | 19 | 17 |
"—" denotes a recording that did not chart or was not released in that territory.

== Singles ==
=== As lead artist ===
| Title | Year | Peak chart positions | | | | | | | | | | Certifications | Album |
| Title | Year | US | US R&B /HH | AUS | CAN | IRL | NZ | SWE | SWI | UK | WW | Certifications | Album |
|---|---|---|---|---|---|---|---|---|---|---|---|---|---|
| "New Freezer" (featuring Kendrick Lamar) | 2017 | 41 | 20 | — | 66 | — | — | — | — | — | — | RIAA: 3× Platinum; MC: Platinum | The World Is Yours |
| "Plug Walk" (solo or remixes featuring Gucci Mane, YG, 2 Chainz, Mabel, Leafs and Ufo361) | 2018 | 13 | 8 | 45 | 13 | 74 | 20 | 79 | 36 | 53 | — | RIAA: 3× Platinum; ARIA: Gold; BPI: Gold; MC: 2× Platinum; RMNZ: Gold | The World Is Yours |
| "Dead Friends" | 2018 | — (Note: "Dead Friends" did not chart on the Billboard Hot 100, but peaked at number 12 on the Bubbling Under Hot 100 chart.) | — (Note: "Dead Friends" did not chart on the Hot R&B/Hip-Hop Songs chart, but peaked at number four on the Bubbling Under R&B/Hip-Hop Songs chart.) | — | 98 | — | — | — | — | — | — | | The World Is Yours |
| "Leave Me" | 2018 | — | — | — | — | — | — | — | — | — | — | RIAA: Gold | The World Is Yours |
| "Talk to Me" (with Tory Lanez or remix with Lil Wayne and DJ Stevie J) | 2018 | 43 | 18 | — | 55 | — | — | — | — | — | — | RIAA: Platinum; BPI: Silver | Love Me Now? |
| "Splashin" (solo or remix with Eponym) | 2018 | 80 | 32 | — | 59 | — | — (Note: "Splashin" did not enter the NZ Top 40 Singles Chart, but peaked at number 21 on the NZ Hot Singles Chart.) | — | — | — | — | RIAA: 2× Platinum | The World Is Yours 2 |
| "4 Phones" | 2019 | — | — | — | — | — | — | — | — | — | — | | The World Is Yours 2 |
| "Tic Toc" (with Tory Lanez) | 2019 | — | — | — | — | — (Note: "Tic Toc" did not enter the NZ Top 40 Singles Chart, but peaked at number 16 on the NZ Hot Singles Chart.) | — | — | — | — | — | | The World Is Yours 2 |
| "That's Tuff" (featuring Quavo) | 2019 | — | — | — | — | — (Note: "That's Tuff" did not enter the NZ Top 40 Singles Chart, but peaked at number 32 on the NZ Hot Singles Chart.) | — | — | — | — | — | | Boss Man |
| "Money Talk" (featuring YoungBoy Never Broke Again) | 2020 | — (Note: "Money Talk" did not chart on the Billboard Hot 100, but peaked at number 7 on the Bubbling Under Hot 100 chart.) | — | — | — | — (Note: "Money Talk" did not enter the NZ Top 40 Singles Chart, but peaked at number 37 on the NZ Hot Singles Chart.) | — | — | — | — | — | | Boss Man |
| "Red" | 2020 | — | — | — | — | — | — | — | — | — | — | | Boss Man |
| "Stuck Together" (featuring Lil Baby and Future) | 2020 | — | — | — | — | — | — | — (Note: "Stuck Together" did not enter the NZ Top 40 Singles Chart or Hot Singles Chart, but peaked at number 40 on the NZ Hot Singles Chart.) | — | — | — | | Boss Man |
| "Too Blessed" (featuring Quavo and Takeoff) | 2020 | — | — | — | — | — | — | — | — | — | — | | Lucky 7 |
| "Bankroll" (with YoungBoy Never Broke Again) | 2020 | — | — | — | — | — | — | — | — | — | — | | Nobody Safe |
| "Feelin' Like Tunechi" (with Lil Wayne) | 2021 | 91 | 40 | — | — | — | — (Note: "Feelin' Like Tunechi" did not enter the NZ Top 40 Singles Chart, but peaked at number 31 on the NZ Hot Singles Chart.) | — | — | — | — | | Trust Fund Babies |
| "Gimme a Second" (with Peso Pluma) | 2024 | — | — | — | — | — | — | — | — | — | — | | Life's a Gamble and Éxodo |
| "Band Man" | 2024 | — | — | — | — | — | — | — | — | — | — | | Life's a Gamble |
| "Gimme a Second 2" (with Peso Pluma and ¥$) | 2024 | — | — | — | — | — | — (Note: "Gimme a Second 2" did not enter the NZ Top 40 Singles Chart, but peaked at number 16 on the NZ Hot Singles Chart.) | — | — | — | — | | Life's a Gamble |
| "Don't Even Call" (with Swae Lee) | 2026 | — | — | — | — | — | — | — | — | — | — | | Same Difference |
"—" denotes a recording that did not chart or was not released in that territory.

=== As featured artist ===
| Title | Year | Peak chart positions | | | | | | | | Certifications | Album |
| Title | Year | US | US R&B /HH | US Rap | AUS | CAN | IRE | NZ | UK | Certifications | Album |
|---|---|---|---|---|---|---|---|---|---|---|---|
| "Birds in LA" (JG featuring Rich the Kid) | 2017 | — | — | — | — | — | — | — | — | | Non-album single |
| "Ring Ring" (Jax Jones featuring Mabel and Rich the Kid) | 2018 | — | — | — | — | — | 15 | — | 12 | BPI: Platinum | Snacks |
| "Echa Pa Aca" (Juan Magan and Pitbull featuring Rich the Kid and RJ Word) | 2018 | — | — | — | — | — | — | — | — | | 4.0 |
| "Creeping" (Lil Skies featuring Rich the Kid) | 2018 | — (Note: "Creeping" did not chart on the Billboard Hot 100, but peaked at number 1 on the Bubbling Under Hot 100 chart.) | 44 | — | — | 93 | — | — | — | | Non-album singles |
| "Sex You Up" (ManCub and Ray J featuring Rich the Kid) | 2018 | — | — | — | — | — | — | — | — | | Non-album singles |
| "Glimpse" (Havana Brown featuring Rich the Kid) | 2018 | — | — | — | — | — | — | — | — | | Non-album singles |
| "No Budget" (Kid Ink featuring Rich the Kid) | 2018 | — | — | — | — | — | — | — | — | | Missed Calls |
| "A.D.H.D. Freestyle Remix" (Sad Frosty featuring Rich the Kid) | 2018 | — | — | — | — | — | — | — | — | | Non-album single |
| "That's On Me (Remix)" (Yella Beezy featuring 2 Chainz, T.I., Rich the Kid, Jeezy, Boosie Badazz and Trapboy Freddy) | 2018 | 56 | 25 | — | — | — | — | — | — | RIAA: Gold | Ain't No Going Bacc |
| "Racks" (Project Pat featuring Gucci Mane and Rich the Kid) | 2018 | — | — | — | — | — | — | — | — | | Non-album singles |
| "WDYW" (Carnage featuring Lil Uzi Vert, ASAP Ferg and Rich the Kid) | 2018 | — | — | — | — | — | — | — | — | RIAA: Gold | Non-album singles |
| "Girls Have Fun" (Tyga featuring G-Eazy and Rich the Kid) | 2019 | — | — | — | 97 | 95 | — | — (Note: "Girls Have Fun" did not enter the NZ Top 40 Singles Chart, but peaked at number 10 on the NZ Hot Singles Chart.) | — | | Legendary (Deluxe) |
| "Facts" (Chantel Jeffries featuring YG, Rich the Kid and BIA) | 2019 | — | — | — | — | — | — | — | — | | Non-album single |
| "Daddy" (Blueface featuring Rich the Kid) | 2019 | 78 | 30 | 25 | — | 72 | — | — | — | RIAA: Platinum | Dirtbag |
| "She Miss Me" (Gucci Mane featuring Rich the Kid) | 2019 | — | — | — | — | — | — | — | — | | East Atlanta Santa 3 |
| "Yes!" (Kyle featuring Rich The Kid and K Camp) | 2020 | — | — | — | — | — | — | — | — | | See You When I Am Famous |
| "Spring Break" (AJ Mitchell featuring Rich the Kid) | 2020 | — | — | — | — | — | — | — | — | | Non-album singles |
| "Afterparty" (Martin Tungevaag and Rat City featuring Rich the Kid) | 2020 | — | — | — | — | — | — | — | — | | Non-album singles |
| "Jungle" (original or remixes with dEVOLVE, TOPANGA HILLS MAFIA, Destructo, Ape-In and Oro; Escapeplan featuring Rich the Kid) | 2022 | — | — | — | — | — | — | — | — | | Non-album singles |
| "My Baby" (Kristii featuring Rich The Kid) | 2022 | — | — | — | — | — | — | — | — | | Non-album singles |
| "Carnival" (¥$ featuring Rich the Kid and Playboi Carti) | 2024 | 1 | 1 | — | 5 | 2 | 6 | 7 | 5 | BPI: Gold; RMNZ: Gold | Vultures 1 |
"—" denotes a recording that did not chart or was not released in that territory.

== Other charted songs ==
| Title | Year | Peak chart positions | | | | | Certifications | Album |
| Title | Year | US Bub. | US Bub. R&B /HH | CAN | NZ Hot | SCO | Certifications | Album |
|---|---|---|---|---|---|---|---|---|
| "Too Gone" (featuring Khalid) | 2018 | — | — | — | — (Note: "Too Gone" did not enter the NZ Top 40 Singles Chart or Hot Singles Chart, but peaked at number nine on the NZ Hot Singles Chart.) | — | | The World Is Yours |
| "Lost It" (featuring Quavo and Offset) | 2018 | 4 | 2 | 91 | — | — | RIAA: Gold | The World Is Yours |
| "End of Discussion" (featuring Lil Wayne) | 2018 | 21 | 7 | — | — | — | | The World Is Yours |
| "Early Morning Trappin" (featuring Trippie Redd) | 2018 | 15 | 5 | — | — | — | RIAA: Gold | The World Is Yours |
| "Fall Threw" (featuring Young Thug and Gunna) | 2019 | 16 | 4 | — | 24 | — | | The World Is Yours 2 |
| "Woah" (featuring Miguel and Ty Dolla Sign) | 2019 | — | — | — | 36 | — | | The World Is Yours 2 |
| "Two Cups" (featuring Offset and Big Sean) | 2019 | — | — | — | 37 | — | | The World Is Yours 2 |
| "Like Mike" (featuring Jay Critch and A Boogie wit da Hoodie) | 2019 | — | — | — | 39 | — | | The World Is Yours 2 |
| "For Keeps" (featuring YoungBoy Never Broke Again) | 2019 | — | — | — | — | — | RIAA: Gold | The World Is Yours 2 |
| "Tides" (KSI featuring AJ Tracey and Rich the Kid) | 2020 | — | — | — | — | 88 | | Dissimulation |
"—" denotes a recording that did not chart or was not released in that territory.

== Guest appearances ==
List of non-single guest appearances, with other performing artists, showing year released and album name
| Title | Year | Other artist(s) | Album |
|---|---|---|---|
| "80's Crack" | 2013 | Peewee Longway | Lobby Runners |
| "Rich N*gga Sh*t" | 2014 | Quality Control Music | Solid Foundation |
| "Water Whip" | 2014 | Quality Control Music | Solid Foundation |
| "Bugatti" | 2014 | Soulja Boy | King Soulja 3 |
| "You Already Know" | 2014 | Soulja Boy, Sean Kingston | Young Millionaire |
| "23 MJ" | 2014 | Soulja Boy | Young Millionaire |
| "OG Gas" | 2015 | Soulja Boy | Loyalty |
| "Lowest" | 2015 | Gucci Mane, OG Maco | 1017 Mafia: Incarcerated |
| "Lunch Freestyle" | 2015 | Gucci Mane, Smurf | Lunch |
| "Whip It" (Remix) | 2015 | iLoveMakonnen | Drink More Water 5 |
| "No Ma'am" | 2015 | iLoveMakonnen, Rome Fortune | Drink More Water 5 |
| "All About Paper" | 2016 | Soulja Boy | Real Soulja 4 Life |
| "Run up da Bandz" | 2016 | Soulja Boy, Kid Red | Real Soulja 4 Life |
| "Zone 1" | 2016 | Soulja Boy | King Soulja VI |
| "Long Time" | 2016 | Soulja Boy | Stacks on Deck |
| "Snapchat" | 2016 | Soulja Boy, Lil Yachty | Stacks on Deck |
| "Hell Yeah | 2016 | Famous Dex | OhhMannGoddDamm |
| "Young Rich N*ggas" | 2016 | Rowdy Rebel | Shmoney Keeps Calling |
| "Rich Forever" | 2016 | Famous Dex | Heartbreak Kid |
| "Goyard" | 2016 | Famous Dex | Heartbreak Kid |
| "I'm Crazy" | 2016 | Famous Dex, Lil Yachty | Heartbreak Kid |
| "U Late" | 2016 | Famous Dex, Pachino | Heartbreak Kid |
| "Goin For Ten" | 2016 | Famous Dex, Quavo | Dexter the Robot |
| "God Damm" | 2016 | Famous Dex | Dexter Different |
| "Mixin' Up the Medicine" | 2016 | Hoodrich Pablo Juan | Designer Drugz 2 |
| "Know My Name" | 2016 | Mustard, RJ | Cold Summer |
| "Rubberband Check" | 2016 | Project Pat, Rick Ross | Street God 3 |
| "Bank of America" | 2016 | Chevy Woods | Gang S*it Only |
| "Spam" | 2017 | Famous Dex, Jay Critch | Read About It |
| "97" | 2017 | K Camp, Bobby Kritical, 1WayFrank | Slum Lords 2 |
| "Where is the Mack" | 2017 | Various Artists | Audiomack EP |
| "Mattress (Remix)" | 2017 | A$AP Ferg, A$AP Rocky, Famous Dex | Still Striving |
| "Somebody" | 2017 | Sy Ari Da Kid | 2 Weeks No Diss |
| "Xotic" | 2018 | DJ Esco, Future, Young Thug | Kolorblind |
| "Double Up" | 2018 | YFN Lucci | 3: The Sequel |
| "Please Don't Cry" | 2018 | Trey Songz | 28 |
| "No Cap" | 2018 | Yung Bino | Believe in Me |
| "Trappin' So Hard" | 2018 | Future, Rico Love | SUPERFLY |
| "Don't Shoot Em" | 2018 | Lil Wayne, Marley G | Dedication 6: Reloaded |
| "Lost Souls" | 2018 | Ski Mask the Slump God | Beware the Book of Eli |
| "Bukkake" | 2018 | Ski Mask the Slump God | Beware the Book of Eli |
| "Everything Rare" | 2018 | Hoodrich Pablo Juan, Danny Wolf | Hood Wolf 2 |
| "FSU" | 2018 | Jay Park, Gashi | Ask Bout Me |
| "AQUAFINA" | 2019 | Lil Peep | Everybody's Everything |
| "Best Friend" | 2019 | DaBaby | Baby On Baby |
| "Bigger" | 2019 | Jay Critch, Mally Bandz | Talk Money Tape 2 |
| "Racks in the Duffle" | 2019 | Jay Critch, Mari Mac | Talk Money Tape 2 |
| "She Wanna" | 2019 | M A E S T R O | Wav God Vol. 2 |
| "Outy When I Drive/Blamed" | 2019 | Chris Brown, Sage the Gemini | Indigo (Extended edition) |
| "Catch My Wave" | 2019 | Lil' Kim | 9 |
| "Bad Moves" | 2020 | DJ Durel, Quavo | Bad Boys for Life |
| "Tides" | 2020 | KSI, AJ Tracey | Dissimulation (Deluxe) |
| "Asthma Attack" | 2020 | Famous Dex, Jay Critch | Diana |
| "What I Like" | 2020 | Famous Dex, Tyga | Diana |
| "Dirty B" | 2020 | Famous Dex | Diana |
| "Personal Favorite" | 2020 | Trippie Redd | Pegasus |
| "Boink Boink" | 2020 | Tory Lanez, VV$ Ken | Loner |
| "Flute" (Remix) | 2021 | Brokeasf | Wrong 1 |
| "Bentley Truck" | 2021 | Yung Bino | Believe in Me 3 |
| "Upset" | 2024 | Lil Tjay | Farewell |
