= The First Purge (soundtrack) =

2018 film score by Kevin Lax

The First Purge (Original Motion Picture Soundtrack)

Film score by Kevin Lax
- Released: June 29, 2018
- Recorded: 2018
- Genre: Film score
- Length: 54:57
- Label: Back Lot Music
- Producer: Kevin Lax

Kevin Lax chronology
Chris Brown: Welcome to My Life (2017)	The First Purge (2018)	Juanita (2019)

The First Purge (Original Motion Picture Soundtrack) is the film score to the 2018 film The First Purge directed by Gerard McMurray, which is the fourth installment in the Purge franchise. Kevin Lax composed the score which was released through Back Lot Music on June 29, 2018.

== Development ==
Kevin Lax composed the film score for The First Purge, replacing Nathan Whitehead who did the same for the predecessors. Lax wanted to keep the essence of the story by remaining consistent with the franchise sound, but in the process, add his own spin by incorporating more raw elements than the general approach of the previous films. Describing the political undertones, Lax considered the film to be provocative voicing the systemic, economic and racial injustices happening in the current world but also provide an entertainment factor. It further effectively understates why people want to take part in The Purge and adding a human element to it. The interesting and challenging aspect for Lax, was the film accommodated numerous shifts in the narrative and genre, ranging from horror, suspense, emotion and action, so keeping it in a unified pacing and congruous tonality was a challenge, and the score was mostly textural in nature opposed to the traditional thematic motives.

The soundtrack for The First Purge remained edgier than the predecessors, but also aggressive and emotional. Lax wanted to create a musical backdrop that contained several unique elements which was not forced, but naturally flow through it bringing a character to the score. Lax took references from the scores composed by Whitehead for the predecessors in order to create a cohesive score thereby compiling various themes, either textural, melodic or both. He had to understand the emotional level of the characters, the narrative arc and going into the drama and intensity of certain scenes, thereby going into the heads of the protagonists. Besides that he also referenced few horror music and unusual sounds, following the same process of his previous horror film Burning Sands (2017).

Lax used several pre-processed sounds included pulses, pads, percussions and analog synths and effect units to expand the sonic palette. He further used the field chants of Afro-American spiritual sounds to underscore the racial elements, while using hip hop and traditional scoring sensibilities for the rest of the score.

== Release ==
Back Lot Music released the soundtrack on June 29, 2018, five days prior to the film's release.

== Track listing ==
No.	Title	Length
1.	"Chance To Purge"	0:30
2.	"Rising Anger"	1:12
3.	"Do Not Participate"	2:28
4.	"Blood Baptism"	1:22
5.	"History of Hurt"	2:29
6.	"Very Angry"	1:36
7.	"Sounding the Alarm"	3:52
8.	"Island Experiment"	2:34
9.	"Isaiah Hits the Streets"	2:10
10.	"Purge Party"	2:37
11.	"Nowhere to Run"	5:21
12.	"Mask On"	0:37
13.	"Getting Personal"	2:27
14.	"The Facts Don't Lie"	2:43
15.	"The Eyes Terrence"	1:40
16.	"Don't Become a Killer"	2:08
17.	"Geared Up, Loaded Up"	1:16
18.	"The Reaper Cometh" (feat. Desiigner)	4:21
19.	"A Savior Rises"	1:25
20.	"The 14th Floor"	5:04
21.	"Evil's Face Revealed"	0:47
22.	"Almost Doesn't Count"	2:58
23.	"Next Year, We Fight"	3:20
Total length:		54:57

== Reception ==
David Edelstein of Vulture and Don Kaye of Den of Geek complimented the score as "bombastic" and "bone-chilling", while Dan Jackson of Thrillist and Austin K. Collins of Vanity Fair described it as "impulsive" and "synth-heavy". Ben Spurling of Movies and Mania wrote "composer Kevin Lax gives us some nice synth lines to go along with it".

== Additional music ==
The following songs are featured in the film but not included in the soundtrack:

- "Uh-Ohh" – Troy Ave
- "Problem Solver" – Tbam
- "Can't Hold Me" – Curly Savv and Dah Dah
- "Mo Bamba" – Sheck Wes
- "Let It Whip" – Dazz Band
- "Catch a Lick" – IamG
- "Dooney Bag" – Caligrafi Jones
- "Alive" – Lil Jon, Offset and 2 Chainz
- "Nascar" – 1Playy
- "Guatemala" – Rae Sremmurd, Swae Lee and Slim Jxmmi
- "Plug Walk" – Rich the Kid
- "Up" – Desiigner
- "Which One Which" – Maestro Harrell
- "Lost It" – Rich the Kid featuring Quavo and Offset
- "Alright" – Kendrick Lamar

== Accolades ==
Awards	Category	Recipient(s) and nominee(s)	Result	Ref.
International Film Music Critics Association	Best Original Score for a Fantasy/Science Fiction/Horror Film	Kevin Lax	Nominated	
