= Life's a Gamble (Rich the Kid album) =

Studio album by Rich the Kid
- Released: July 19, 2024
- Length: 39:47
- Labels: RTK; Rich Forever; Gamma
- Producers: ¥$ (exec.); 2K; Cassius Clay; Childish Major; D.A. Got That Dope; Digital Nas; DJ Durel; Foreigngotem; Hitkidd; the Legendary Traxster; Murda Beatz; Nyan; Ojivolta; SkipOnDaBeat; Star Boy; Supah Mario; TheLabCook; Tim Maxey

Rich the Kid chronology
Trust Fund Babies (2021)	Life's a Gamble (2024)

Singles from Life's a Gamble
- 1. "Gimme a Second" / "Band Man" Released: May 24, 2024; 2. "Gimme a Second 2" Released: June 21, 2024

Life's a Gamble is the fourth studio album by American rapper Rich the Kid, released on July 19, 2024, independently through RTK, Rich Forever Music, and Gamma. The album is executively produced by ¥$, who provide guest appearances alongside Peso Pluma, Offset, French Montana, Chief Keef, Bia, Quavo, and Young Adz. It follows Rich's collaborative mixtape with Lil Wayne, Trust Fund Babies (2021), as well as his third studio album, Boss Man (2020).

== Background ==
Rich The Kid spoke to Billboard magazine about what happened to him as an artist following his 2020 album Boss Man, saying he had to deal “with stuff behind the scenes with labels, but I feel like the time that has gone by, I been able to perfect my craft. I’ve been able to perfect the songs and the music and I know exactly what the sound is, what i’m shooting for,” he adds.

== Critical reception ==
Professional ratings
Review scores
Source	Rating
Clash	7/10
Ratings Games Music	C+

Clash wrote that “this is a record that succeeds in bursts, one that sparks into life before moving forwards once more. A noble solo experiment, it allows Rich The Kid to redefine his rules, on his own terms.”

== Release and promotion ==
Following the success of ¥$'s song "Carnival" with Rich the Kid and Playboi Carti, Rich officially announced Life's a Gamble. He stated that it would be executively produced by ¥$, consisting of Kanye West and Ty Dolla Sign. Initial tracklists and announcements had Carnival as a part of the album due to the song's success. Despite that, it wasn't on the album on launch.

On May 24, 2024, Rich the Kid released the album's second single, "Gimme a Second / Band Man", with "Gimme a Second" featuring Peso Pluma. It was also featured on Pluma's fourth studio album Éxodo.

== Track listing ==
Life's a Gamble track listing
No.	Title	Writer(s)	Producer(s)	Length
1.	"Intro"	Dimitri Leslie Roger	Childish Major; Tim Maxey	1:17
2.	"Gimme a Second" (with Peso Pluma)	Roger; Hassan Laija; Daryl McPherson; Grant Dickinson	DJ Durel; TheLabCook	2:53
3.	"Not In the Mood" (with Offset)	Roger; Kiari Kendrell Cephus	D.A. Got That Dope	1:47
4.	"New Chanel Freestyle"	Roger	SkipOnDaBeat	1:25
5.	"Upside Down" (with French Montana)	Roger; Karim Kharbouch	D.A. Got That Dope	2:31
6.	"Back Then"	Roger		1:35
7.	"Louie Coat" (with Chief Keef)	Roger; Keith Farrelle Cozart	Murda Beatz; Foreigngotem	2:59
8.	"Band Man"	Roger	D.A. Got That Dope	1:48
9.	"Like Yoga" (with Bia)	Roger; Bianca Miquela Landrau	Hitkidd	2:40
10.	"Hold On"	Roger		2:41
11.	"Tell Me" (with Young Adz)	Roger; Nathaniel Williams	Cassius Clay	3:03
12.	"Gimme a Second 2" (with Peso Pluma and ¥$)	Roger; Nasir Pemberton; Ye; Tyrone Griffin, Jr.; Samuel Lindley; Laija	Digital Nas; West; the Legendary Traxster	2:51
13.	"Keep It Exclusive" (with Quavo)	Roger; Quavious Keyate Marshall	2K	2:13
14.	"Sometimes"	Roger; Nyan King	Nyan	3:08
15.	"No Mileage"	Roger	Star Boy	2:27
16.	"Plain Jane" (with Kanye West)	Roger; Ye	SkipOnDaBeat	2:16
17.	"Rocking & Rolling"	Roger; Jonathan Priester	Supah Mario	2:05
Total length:				39:47
