= Japan (song) =

Single by Famous Dex

from the album Dex Meets Dexter
- Released: March 16, 2018
- Recorded: 2017
- Genre: Hip hop; trap
- Length: 2:24
- Label: Rich Forever Music; 300
- Songwriters: Dexter Gore, Jr.; Julian Gramma
- Producer: J Gramm

Famous Dex singles chronology
"In the Bank" (2018)	"Japan" (2018)	"Light" (2018)

Music video
- Japan on YouTube

"Japan" is a song by American rapper Famous Dex. The song, produced by JGramm, was released to streaming services on March 16, 2018. The song peaked at #28 on the Billboard Hot 100.

== Background ==
“Japan” is the second single from Famous Dex's debut album, Dex Meets Dexter. Famous Dex first premiered the song June 2017 on Instagram. The song gained massive popularity online due to the viral lyric video featuring Famous Dex on green screen visuals, and Internet dance sensation Roy Purdy creating a dance challenge to the song.

== Music video ==
An animated lyric video by visual artist GOODARTSUCKS was released with the song on March 16, 2018. The video garnered over 20 million views in a month. A music video was released on May 24, 2018, directed by Xavier Andrews.As Of Jan 2026 the video is approaching 150 million views on youtube

== Charts ==
=== Weekly charts ===
Weekly chart performance
Chart (2018)	Peak position
Canada Hot 100 (Billboard)	40
US Billboard Hot 100	28
US Hot R&B/Hip-Hop Songs (Billboard)	18

=== Year-end charts ===
Annual chart rankings
Chart (2018)	Position
US Hot R&B/Hip-Hop Songs (Billboard)	60
US Streaming Songs (Billboard)	70

== Certifications ==
Region	Certification	Certified units/sales
Portugal (AFP)	Gold	5,000^{‡}
United Kingdom (BPI)	Silver	200,000^{‡}
United States (RIAA)	2× Platinum	2,000,000^{‡}
^{‡} Sales+streaming figures based on certification alone.
