= Them Days =

Them Days may refer to:

- "Them Days", song by Crazy Town from Darkhorse
- "Them Days", song by Famous Dex from Dex Meets Dexter
- "Them Days", song by The New Toronto
