= Dex Meets Dexter =

Studio album by Famous Dex
- Released: April 6, 2018
- Recorded: 2017
- Genres: Hip-hop; trap
- Length: 39:24
- Labels: Rich Forever; 300
- Producers: A. Lau; Beardeaux; Boaz van de Beatz; D. A. Doman; Davaughn; Diplo; FKi 1st; Glohan Beats; Itsallgood; J Gramm; Jaasu; Jarrod Lacy; Pi'erre Bourne; Resource; Roca Beats; Ronny J; Roofeeo; $B; Sosa 808

Famous Dex chronology
Rich Forever 3 (2017)	Dex Meets Dexter (2018)	Rich Forever 4 (2019)

Singles from Dex Meets Dexter
- 1. "Pick It Up" Released: October 20, 2017; 2. "Japan" Released: March 16, 2018; 3. "Light" Released: March 30, 2018

Dex Meets Dexter is the debut studio album by American rapper Famous Dex. It was released on April 6, 2018, by 300 Entertainment and Rich Forever Music. The album features guest appearances from Diplo, ASAP Rocky, Wiz Khalifa, and Drax Project.

The album has been supported by three singles: "Pick It Up" featuring ASAP Rocky, "Japan" and "Light" featuring Drax Project.

== Singles ==
The album's lead single, "Pick It Up" featuring ASAP Rocky, was originally released on Famous Dex's SoundCloud account on October 18, 2017, before being released to streaming services on October 20, 2017. Its music video was released on January 17, 2018.

The album's second single, "Japan", was released to streaming services on March 16, 2018. It has peaked so far at #28 on the Billboard Hot 100, becoming Dex's highest charting single.

The album's third single, "Light" featuring Drax Project was released on March 30, 2018.

== Track listing ==
Credits adapted from Tidal

No.	Title	Writer(s)	Producer(s)	Length
1.	"DMD"	Dexter Gore, Jr.; Jordan Jenks	Pi'erre Bourne	2:28
2.	"Prove It"	Gore, Jr.; James Davaughn Lennard	Davaughn	3:28
3.	"Japan"	Gore, Jr.; Julian Gramma	J Gramm	2:22
4.	"Deadpool"	Gore, Jr.; Dylan Duenas	$B	2:24
5.	"Light" (featuring Drax Project)	Gore, Jr.; Matt Beachen; Ben O'Leary; Shaan Singh; Sam Thomson; Lennard; Jarrod Lacy; Adrian Lau	Davaughn; A. Lau; Lacy	3:18
6.	"Celine"	Gore, Jr.; Jaasu Mallory; Max Wohlman	Jaasu; Itsallgood	1:55
7.	"Take Her" (featuring Wiz Khalifa)	Gore, Jr.; Cameron Thomaz; Braylin Bowman; Jahphet Landis	Resource; Roofeeo	3:21
8.	"Hemi"	Gore, Jr.; Ronald J. Spencer, Jr.	Ronny J	1:50
9.	"Pick It Up" (featuring ASAP Rocky)	Gore, Jr.; Rakim Mayers; Trocon Markous Roberts; Anthony Hester	FKi 1st; Sosa 808	3:11
10.	"Them Days"	Gore, Jr.; Duenas	$B	3:30
11.	"Said So"	Gore, Jr.; David Doman; Thomas Perez, Jr.	D. A. Doman	5:00
12.	"XOXO"	Gore, Jr.; Nicholas Leveston	Glohan Beats	2:00
13.	"Chump"	Gore, Jr.; Christian Roca	Roca Beats	2:36
14.	"Champion" (featuring Diplo)	Gore, Jr.; Thomas Wesley Pentz; Boaz de Jong	Diplo; Boaz van de Beatz; Beardeaux	2:00
Total length:				39:24

Notes

- ^{^[a]} signifies an uncredited co-producer.
- ^{^[a]} all tracks are capitalized.

== Charts ==
=== Weekly charts ===
Chart (2018)	Peak position
US Billboard 200	12
US Top R&B/Hip-Hop Albums (Billboard)	10
US Top Rap Albums (Billboard)	9

=== Year-end charts ===
Chart (2018)	Position
US Top R&B/Hip-Hop Albums (Billboard)	79

== Certifications ==
Region	Certification	Certified units/sales
United States (RIAA)	Gold	500,000^{‡}
^{‡} Sales+streaming figures based on certification alone.
