= Pick It Up (Famous Dex song) =

"Pick it Up"

Single by Famous Dex featuring ASAP Rocky

from the album Dex Meets Dexter
- Released: October 20, 2017 (Official); October 18, 2017 (SoundCloud)
- Recorded: 2017
- Genre: Hip hop; trap
- Length: 3:11
- Label: Rich Forever Music; 300
- Songwriters: Dexter Gore Jr.; Rakim Mayers; Trocon Roberts; Anthony Hester
- Producers: FKi 1st; Sosa808

Famous Dex singles chronology
"Ran Off wit Yo Bish" (2017)	"Pick it Up" (2017)	"In the Bank" (2018)

ASAP Rocky singles chronology
"No Limit" (2017)	"Pick It Up" (2017)	"Cocky" (2018)

Music video
- Pick It Up on YouTube

"Pick It Up" is a song by American rapper Famous Dex featuring fellow American rapper ASAP Rocky. The song was produced by FKi 1st and Sosa808, and heavily samples Cissy Houston's "Nothing Can Stop Me". It was originally released on Famous Dex's SoundCloud account on October 18, 2017, before being released to streaming services on October 20, 2017. The song peaked at number 54 on the Billboard Hot 100 and has been certified three-times platinum by the RIAA.

== Music video ==
A music video for the song was released on January 7, 2018, directed by AWGE and Hidji Films.

== Charts ==
=== Weekly charts ===
Chart (2017–2018)	Peak position
Canada Hot 100 (Billboard)	60
Latvia (DigiTop100)	65
US Billboard Hot 100	54
US Hot R&B/Hip-Hop Songs (Billboard)	26

=== Year-end charts ===
Chart (2018)	Position
US Hot R&B/Hip-Hop Songs (Billboard)	64

== Certifications ==
Region	Certification	Certified units/sales
New Zealand (RMNZ)	Platinum	30,000^{‡}
United Kingdom (BPI)	Silver	200,000^{‡}
United States (RIAA)	3× Platinum	3,000,000^{‡}
^{‡} Sales+streaming figures based on certification alone.
