= Year of the Savage =

Studio album by Robb Banks
- Released: October 2, 2015
- Recorded: 2015
- Genre: Hip hop
- Length: 40:55
- Labels: SS Records; 300 Entertainment; Dorian
- Producers: Robb Banks (also exec.); Nuez; Nuri; INDIGOCHILDRICK; Nick León; Zaytoven; SpaceGhostPurrp; Father; Zander

Singles from Year of the Savage
- 1. "2PhoneShawty" Released: December 10, 2014; 2. "Pressure" Released: August 13, 2015

Year of the Savage is the debut studio album by American hip hop recording artist Robb Banks, released on October 2, 2015, under SS Records with 300 Entertainment's Dorian Distribution. The album features guest appearances from Pouya, Lucki and IndigoChildRick. The album's production was handled by Nuez, Nuri, INDIGOCHILDRICK, Nick León, Zaytoven, SpaceGhostPurrp, Robb himself and more.

== Background ==
Between 2011 and 2012, Banks divulged the title of his debut album, Year of the Savage.

Throughout 2014, Robb began touring around the world and rarely released new music, only to show that he is still working on Year of the Savage. This was until the end of the year, when he began hinting new projects that have been in the work. In December, Banks put out the first (promotional) single for his debut commercial release, called "2PhoneShawty". It ended up being the only song recorded in 2013 on the entire album.

In 2015, he started working on a new batch of music for Year of the Savage, which would mainly feature production from his new affiliate Nuez. On August 13, 2015, Banks released the lead single for his album, titled "Pressure". After that he continued to promote Year of the Savage by releasing a bunch of freestyled tracks. It was during one of these freestyles ("Throw It Up") that he confirmed the release date for his long-awaited album.

== Singles ==
The album's (first) promotional single, "2PhoneShawty" was released on December 10, 2014. The song was produced by SpaceGhostPurrp.

On August 13, 2015, Banks released the lead single for his album, titled "Pressure". The song was produced by Nick León, Father and Zander.

== Track listing ==
Year of the Savage
No.	Title	Producer(s)	Length
1.	"Outro"	Young Savage	0:59
2.	"Buku"	Nuez	3:07
3.	"Leatherface"	Nuez	4:04
4.	"Half Bae" (featuring Pouya)	INDIGOCHILDRICK; Nuez; Nuri	2:51
5.	"Wit'"	INDIGOCHILDRICK	3:05
6.	"ChainSwang"	Zaytoven; Nuri; Nuez	2:46
7.	"Pressure"	Father; Nick León; Zander	3:32
8.	"Phone Sex" (featuring Lucki Eck$)	Nuri	3:33
9.	"Pink Pussy"	Nuez; Nick León	4:12
10.	"FuckUMean" (featuring INDIGOCHILDRICK)	Nuri	3:21
11.	"2PhoneShawty"	SpaceGhostPurrp	5:12
12.	"3D"	Nick León	4:13
Total length:			40:08

SoundCloud bonus track
No.	Title	Producer(s)	Length
8.	"Ca2ie" (featuring Young Neil)	Nuez; Uncle Flex	5:40
Total length:			45:48

Notes

- "Ca2ie" contains a hidden track titled "Back & Forth"

== Charts ==
Chart (2015)	Peak position
US Heatseekers Albums (Billboard)	11
US Top R&B/Hip-Hop Albums (Billboard)	28
US Top Rap Albums (Billboard)	21
