= Solid Foundation =

2014 mixtape by Quality Control Music

Mixtape by Quality Control Music
- Released: February 3, 2014
- Recorded: 2013–2014
- Genre: Hip hop • trap
- Length: 72:39
- Label: Quality Control Music
- Producers: 30 Roc; Butla; Dee Money; DJ Plugg; DJ Suede; Hittman Traxx; JB Did It; Mercy; Metro Boomin; Murda Beatz; Spiffy; Will A Fool; Young CEO; Zaytoven

Quality Control Music chronology
Solid Foundation (2014)	Control the Streets, Volume 1 (2017)

Solid Foundation is the debut compilation mixtape by the American record label Quality Control Music. It was released on February 3, 2014. It features artists from the label including Migos, Rich The Kid, Skippa Da Flippa, Jose Guapo, Johnny Cinco, Lil Duke, Chill Will, Dirty Dave, Cartie, and Losie. The mixtape has only one outside appearance, from Gucci Mane. Its production was handled by Murda Beatz, Mercy, Dee Money, 30 Roc, Spiffy, Zaytoven, Hittman Traxx, Butla, Metro Boomin, Will A Fool, Young CEO and JB Did It, among others.

== Background ==
The mixtape was scheduled to drop during Super Bowl Sunday, but it was delayed by several hours.

== Promotion ==
Before the mixtape's release, a promotional vlog directed by Keemotion was released.

== Reception ==
Jake Rohn for BET wrote, "For fans who enjoy the hard-hitting beats that have established the South in the mainstream, Solid Foundation is exactly what it's [sic] name suggests, but as a group, Quality Control Music still has a ways to go if they're looking to keep building."

== Track listing ==
No.	Title	Producers	Length
1.	"Kick The Door Down" (Quavo, Losie, Jose Guapo & Lil Duke)	Murda Beatz	4:31
2.	"Get Down" (Migos featuring Gucci Mane)	Mercy; DJ Plugg	4:16
3.	"How Does It Feel?" (Losie)	DJ Plugg	2:43
4.	"Rich Nigga Shit" (Rich The Kid)	Dee Money	2:43
5.	"ATM" (Jose Guapo & Lil Duke)	30 Roc	3:49
6.	"No Choice" (Johnny Cinco)	Spiffy	3:08
7.	"Dramatic" (Migos)	Zaytoven	4:23
8.	"Shawn Kemp" (Chill Will & Migos)	Zaytoven; Makkis	4:15
9.	"Designer" (Skippa Da Flippa & Johnny Cinco)	Hittman Traxx	2:47
10.	"When We Ride" (Lil Duke)	Butla	2:24
11.	"Ounces" (Migos)	Metro Boomin; Zaytoven	4:16
12.	"Water Whip" (Rich The Kid, Chill Will & Dirty Dave)	Murda Beatz; Makkis	4:19
13.	"They Gave The Wrong Young Nigga Money" (Johnny Cinco)	Will-A-Fool	3:48
14.	"R.N.S" (Lil Duke & Losie)	Metro Boomin; Makkis	3:04
15.	"Married To The Money" (Cartie)	Young CEO	4:05
16.	"Fuck The Rap Game (Remix)" (Jose Guapo & Migos)	Metro Boomin	4:57
17.	"Surrender" (Chill Will)	JB Did It	5:52
18.	"Roger That" (Losie)	DJ Plugg	3:08
19.	"I Really Do This" (Dirty Dave)		3:00
20.	"QC Addiction" (Migos, Skippa Da Flippa & Lil Duke)	Keenan Webb	4:31
Total length:			72:39
