= Until I Return =

Mixtape by YoungBoy Never Broke Again
- Released: November 13, 2020
- Genre: Hip hop
- Length: 40:15
- Label: Never Broke Again; Atlantic
- Producer: ABOnTheBeat; Audio Jacc; Bak; Bans; BJ Beatz; Bobby Raps; Brxtn; Callari; Cheese; David Morse; Dubba-AA; DY Krazy; Ferno; Frankie Bash; Haze; HitmanAudio; India Got Them Beats; Jack LoMastro; Jacob Wolfe; Jerome Malfliet; J Inc.; Jonnie Hope; Joseph L’Étranger; JULiA LEWiS; KiddFreddo; Lilkdubb; ManOhManFoster; Max Lord; Mike Laury; Mike Wavvs; Mook On The Beats; Murda Beatz; Paul Cabbin; PlayboyXO; Saucey Beats; TayTayMadeIt; Thank You Fizzle; Wallis Lane

YoungBoy Never Broke Again chronology
Top (2020)	Until I Return (2020)	Nobody Safe (2020)

Until I Return is the fifteenth solo mixtape by American rapper YoungBoy Never Broke Again. It was released on November 13, 2020, by Never Broke Again and Atlantic Records. The mixtape was released completely solo without any features.

The mixtape debuted at No. 10 on the Billboard 200 albums chart.

== Background ==
The mixtape was first released on Wednesday, November 11, 2020, exclusively on YouTube, however, through Atlantic Records and Never Broke Again, it was distributed onto all streaming services just two days later on November 13, 2020.

== Critical reception ==
Professional ratings
Review scores
Source	Rating
AllMusic	3/5 stars

Until I Return received mediocre reviews from critics. AllMusic's Neil Z. Yeung noted that the mixtape "[showcases] Youngboy's Young Thug-influenced sing-song vocals and rapid-fire bars."

== Commercial performance ==
Until I Return debuted at number ten on the US Billboard 200 chart, earning 31,000 album-equivalent units (including 500 pure album sales) in its first week. This became Youngboy's fourth US top-ten album debut in 2020. This mixtape also accumulated a total of 47.49 million on-demand streams of the set's songs during the tracking week.

== Track listing ==
Until I Return track listing
No.	Title	Writer(s)	Producer(s)	Length
1.	"Whitey Bulger"	Kentrell Gaulden; Aaron Lockhart Jr.; Jonathon Montoya; Michael Laury	Dubba-AA; Jonnie Hope; Mike Laury	3:33
2.	"Around"	Gaulden; Tavian Carter	TayTayMadeIt	2:38
3.	"Chopper City"	Gaulden; Gregory Sanders Jr.; India Williams; Carter	HitmanAudio; India Got Them Beats; TayTayMadeIt	2:33
4.	"Toxic"	Gaulden; ABOnTheBeat; Alexander Bak; Colin Franken; Benjamin Falik	ABOnTheBeat; Bak; Frankie Bash; JULiA LEWiS	3:20
5.	"Casket Fresh"	Gaulden; Jeremy McIntyre; Shane Lindstrom; Lerron Carson	Joseph L’Étranger; Murda Beatz; Paul Cabbin	2:35
6.	"Mask On"	Gaulden; Brandon Russell; Kyre Trask	BJ Beatz; Lilkdubb	2:04
7.	"Funds"	Gaulden; Max Lord; Joshua Goldenberg	Max Lord; Thank You Fizzle	2:41
8.	"I Expect You"	Gaulden; Robert Richardson; Dwan Avery	Bobby Raps; DY Krazy	2:49
9.	"Off 1Tenth"	Gaulden; Brayon Nelson; Jarrian Thompson	Mook On The Beats; PlayboyXO	2:08
10.	"Thrasher"	Gaulden; Leonardo Mateus; Jason Goldberg; Ethan Hayes	Bans; Cheese; Haze	2:48
11.	"Walking Dead"	Gaulden; Goldberg; Russell; Aman Nikhanj	BJ Beatz; Saucey Beats	3:18
12.	"3am"	Gaulden; Goldberg; Dante Guzzi; Jacob Wolfe	Cheese; Ferno; Jacob Wolfe	2:08
13.	"Emotional Torn"	Gaulden; Goldberg; David Morse; Jackson LoMastro; Michael Washington Jr.; Paimon Jahanbin; Nima Jahanbin	David Morse; Jack LoMastro; Mike Wavvs; Wallis Lane	3:08
14.	"Doomed"	Gaulden; Jack Mungan; Goldberg; Jacob Cornelius; Zachary Foster	Audio Jacc; Cheese; J Inc.; ManOhManFoster	2:44
15.	"Top Say"	Gaulden; Braxton Troxel; Jerome Malfliet; Friendlor Nomincy	Brxtn; Jerome Malfliet; KiddFreddo	1:48
Total length:				40:15

== Personnel ==
Credits adapted from Tidal.

- Jason "Cheese" Goldberg – mastering
- Jason "Cheese" Goldberg – mixing
- Jason "Cheese" Goldberg – recording (1, 2, 4–15)
- Mark Dorflinger – recording (3)

== Charts ==
Chart performance for Until I Return
Chart (2020)	Peak position
US Billboard 200	10
US Top R&B/Hip-Hop Albums (Billboard)	5
