= Molly World =

Mixtape by Robb Banks
- Released: March 9, 2018
- Recorded: 2017–18
- Studio: Hit Factory Studios (Miami, Florida)
- Genre: Hip hop
- Length: 40:51
- Label: SS Records; Empire
- Producer: Nuri; INDIGOCHILDRICK; Nuez; Natra Average; Richie Souf; Cris Dinero; KP Beatz; DJ Flippp; A.R; ARNOLDISDEAD; Melv

Robb Banks chronology
2: Pillz (2017)	Molly World (2018)	Cloverfield 3 (2018)

Singles from Molly World
- 1. "ILYSM" Released: November 30, 2017; 2. "Ride Wit Me" Released: March 1, 2018

Molly World is a commercial mixtape by American rapper Robb Banks. It was released on March 9, 2018, by SS Records and Empire Distribution. The mixtape features guest appearances from Chief Keef, Birdman, Zoey Dollaz, Famous Dex and Lil Gnar. It was produced by INDIGOCHILDRICK, Richie Souf, Nuri and Cris Dinero, among others.

== Background ==
Banks spoke about the project on Noisey.

"The album is the best body of light work I put out to date, At the end of the day, it's just a pit stop on the way to Falconia, but I feel like I successfully blended both my sounds that were fan favorites into one release."

== Singles ==
The first single, "ILYSM" featuring Famous Dex, was released on November 30, 2017. The song was produced by Natra Average. The track was originally teased by Bank$ with a 60-second snippet in EP "Cloverfield 2.0". Its music video was released on January 11, 2018.

On March 1, 2018, Bank$ released promotional single "Ride Wit Me" featuring Chief Keef. The song was produced by Nuri.

== Track listing ==
Molly World
No.	Title	Producer(s)	Length
1.	"225"	Nuri	3:12
2.	"Ride Wit Me" (featuring Chief Keef)	Nuri; Melv	3:07
3.	"Bring It Bak"	Richie Souf	2:59
4.	"SLS Freestyle"	A.R; DJ Flippp; KP Beatz	2:48
5.	"ILYSM" (featuring Famous Dex)	Natra Average	2:32
6.	"Lie2Me"	INDIGOCHILDRICK	2:42
7.	"Smoke" (featuring Zoey Dollaz)	Richie Souf	2:08
8.	"I Need a 2nd"	ARNOLDISDEAD	2:40
9.	"Griffith Did Nothing Wrong"	Cris Dinero	2:38
10.	"Official"	Nuez	2:46
11.	"I'm That Nigga" (featuring Lil Gnar)	Cris Dinero	3:20
12.	"Over Here"	INDIGOCHILDRICK	4:13
13.	"Green Hearted (iDigg)" (featuring Birdman)	INDIGOCHILDRICK	2:46
Total length:			40:51

Bonus track
No.	Title	Producer(s)	Length
14.	"Let da Beat Build"	Richie Souf	3:02
Total length:			43:53
