= Nobody Safe =

Mixtape by Rich The Kid and YoungBoy Never Broke Again
- Released: November 20, 2020
- Genre: Hip hop
- Length: 39:57
- Label: Rich Forever; Never Broke Again; Empire

Rich The Kid chronology
Boss Man (2020)	Nobody Safe (2020)	Lucky 7 (2021)

YoungBoy Never Broke Again chronology
Until I Return (2020)	Nobody Safe (2020)	Sincerely, Kentrell (2021)

Singles from Nobody Safe
- 1. "Bankroll" Released: October 16, 2020; 2. "Automatic" Released: November 13, 2020

Nobody Safe is a collaborative mixtape between American rappers Rich the Kid and YoungBoy Never Broke Again. This mixtape released on November 20, 2020 through Rich Forever, Never Broke Again, and Empire. The features on this album include Quando Rondo, Lil Wayne, and Rod Wave.

== Background ==
On June 25, 2020, Rich and YoungBoy Never Broke Again announced Nobody Safe to release the next month, then delayed to November 13, 2020, which was then delayed to November 20, 2020 for unknown reasons.

They released the single "Bankroll" on October 16, 2020 along with the pre-order link.

A week before the album released, the two released the single "Automatic" on November 13, 2020.

== Tracklisting ==
No.	Title	Producer(s)	Length
1.	"Nobody Safe"	Painkid	2:21
2.	"No Flash"	ChaseTheMoney; Wheezy	2:22
3.	"You Bad"	Lactose James; Callari; Hagan; Wonder Boy Beats	2:22
4.	"Bankroll"	Budda Beats	2:48
5.	"Automatic"	Dy Krazy; TrePounds	2:36
6.	"So Sorry"	Hurtboy AG; Callari; MoneyEvery	1:57
7.	"Sex"	12Hunna; DY Krazy; Pvlace; Gunboi	2:06
8.	"Doors Up"	CashMoneyAP; Dez Wright	2:53
9.	"Woke Up"	Murda Beatz; ManOhManFoster	2:45
10.	"Rings On"	Dior; Guwap$ of Beat Execs	3:05
11.	"Took A Risk" (featuring Quando Rondo)	Pliznaya; Johnny Dutra	2:45
12.	"Body Bag" (featuring Lil Wayne)	Dremusiq; Dubba-AA; Louie Bandz	2:30
13.	"Sorry Momma" (featuring Rod Wave)	CashMoneyAP; Mook On The Beats	3:53
14.	"Brown Hair"	Dubba-AA; Louie Bandz; LukasBL; YenEuroDollar	3:11
15.	"Can't Let The World In"	12Hunna; BJ Beatz; Foreigngotem	2:27
Total length:			39:57
