= Famous Dex =

American rapper (born 1993)

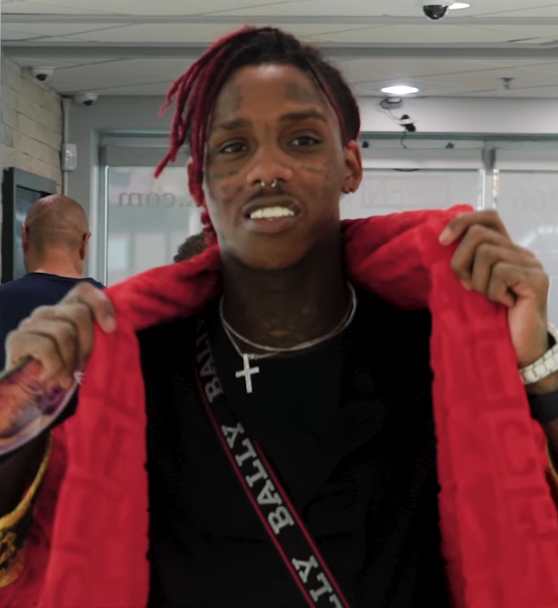
- Famous Dex in 2018

Background information
- Also known as: Dexter; Dex; Black Migo Dex
- Born: Dexter Tiewon Gore Jr. September 6, 1993 (age 33) (Note: Gore's birthplace have been disputed by several sources as either Harlem, New York City or Chicago, Illinois, U.S.)
- Origin: Chicago, Illinois, U.S.
- Genres: Experimental hip-hop; trap; comedy hip-hop
- Occupations: Rapper; songwriter
- Years active: 2012–present
- Labels: Rich Forever; 300; Atlantic

Dexter Tiewon Gore Jr. (born September 6, 1993), known professionally as Famous Dex, is an American rapper. His debut studio album, Dex Meets Dexter (2018) peaked at number 12 on the Billboard 200 while its singles, "Pick It Up" (featuring ASAP Rocky) and "Japan" peaked at numbers 54 and 28 respectively on the Billboard Hot 100.

== Early life ==
Dexter Tiewon Gore Jr. was born on September 6, 1993. He spent much of his childhood on the South Side of Chicago, Illinois, in the city's Englewood community area. Gore is of African-American, Jamaican, Indian and Moroccan descent. He decided to pursue music after his mother Pamela Diana Winters-Gore died of breast cancer in September 2014. In 2016, he tattooed a pink ribbon on his face to commemorate her

== Career ==
=== 2015–2016: Early mixtapes and signing to Rich the Kid's label ===
In 2015, he self-released his first mixtape, Never Seen It Coming. Later in 2015, he released his second mixtape, Dexter's Laboratory (not to be confused with the animated television series of the same name).

In early 2016, Gore released his third and fourth mixtapes, Drippy and #OhhMannGoddDamn.

In March 2016, Gore announced that he was officially signed to Rich the Kid's label, Rich Forever Music. Shortly thereafter, Gore and Rich released their collaborative effort, Rich Forever. This was followed by three sequels, with the third exclusively featuring Rich Forever newcomer New York rapper Jay Critch. In October 2016, Gore was featured in the Soulja Boy music video, "Draco".

=== 2017–2018: Dex Meets Dexter ===
In March 2017, Gore announced the title of his debut album, Dex Meets Dexter. The album was released on April 6, 2018.

In October 2017, he released "Pick It Up" featuring ASAP Rocky as the first single from the album, which peaked at number 54 on the Billboard Hot 100, becoming his first song to chart. The album's second single "Japan" was released on March 16, 2018. On March 30, 2018, he released the single "Light" featuring Drax Project.

The single "Nervous" which features Lil Baby, Jay Critch, and Rich The Kid was released on September 21, 2018.

=== 2019–present: Dexter 2031 EP and Diana ===
On May 8, 2019, the single "Fully Loaded" was released which featured Lil Gotit. A music video was released later on May 27, 2019. Gore appeared on the Rich Forever Music compilation album, Rich Forever 4, which was released on August 2, 2019, and featured new artists signed to the label.

On November 1, 2019, Gore suffered a epileptic seizure during a performance at 1 OAK in West Hollywood, California. A representative later confirmed he was recovering.

On December 31, 2019, Gore released the EP, Dexter 2031. The single "What I Like" which features Tyga and Rich the Kid was released on April 3, 2020. On July 23, he released the single "Couped Out" with Fivio Foreign. In August 2020, he released the single "Hold On". On October 9, he released the album Diana.

== Controversies ==
=== Shocktoberfest controversy ===
In 2018, prior to the University of California, Irvine's Shocktoberfest music event, the university's Student Services was criticized for allowing Gore to perform at the event after a security video from two years prior emerged showing Gore chasing his girlfriend down a hallway and then hitting her several times. Gore was permitted to perform despite the domestic abuse revelations, and while doing so jumped into the crowded audience causing safety barriers to be knocked over by a rush of audience members. The event was shut down as a result. While leaving the event, it was alleged someone in Gore's vehicle pointed a gun at students. According to the university's official campus newspaper, "Gore bragged online about shutting down the event saying, 'I just shut the show down. And it was all positive vibes.'"

=== Racist comment ===
On December 22, 2018, Gore uploaded a video post to his Instagram page in which he made racially charged jokes at the expense of an elderly Indian American Hindu cashier at a gas station he was frequenting with a friend. During the video, he remarks "Witcho' lil", referring to the man's tilaka on his forehead. He then adds "That's a mark of Buddha in between yo' face?", laughing along with his friend.

=== Substance abuse ===
Gore has struggled with substance abuse throughout his career. In 2020, following release of a video showing him in an extremely inebriated position, fans expressed concern. Shortly after, he checked into a rehabilitation facility. Rich the Kid announced in January 2021 that Gore was in a rehabilitation clinic.

=== Arrest ===
In June 2021, Gore was arrested while appearing in court for violating a protection order put in place by his former partner. He was subsequently sentenced to 364 days in a Los Angeles, California, jail on September 1, 2021.

== Discography ==
Famous Dex discography
- Studio albums: 2
- Singles: 11
- Collaborative albums: 6
- Mixtapes: 11
- EPs: 4

=== Studio albums ===
Title	Details	Peak chart positions				Certifications
Title	Details	US	US R&B/HH	US Rap	CAN	Certifications
Dex Meets Dexter	Released: April 6, 2018; Label: Rich Forever Music, 300 Entertainment; Format: Digital download, LP	12	10	9	22	RIAA: Gold
Diana	Released: October 9, 2020; Label: Rich Forever Music, 300 Entertainment; Format: Digital download, LP	—	—	—	—	
"—" denotes a recording that did not chart or was not released in that territory.

=== Extended plays ===
Title	Details
Jugg And Finesse (with Ghetty)	Released: December 9, 2015; Label: Self released; Format: Digital download
When Polo Met Dexter (with Polo Boy Shawty)	Released: February 10, 2018; Label: 916% ENTERTAINMENT, Rich Forever Music; Format: Digital download
Ballin Season (with Ghetty)	Released: August 26, 2018; Label: Vision Driven Murphy Inc., Rich Forever Music; Format: Digital download
Dexter 2031	Released: January 2, 2020; Label: Rich Forever Music; Format: Digital download

=== Mixtapes ===
List of mixtapes, with details
Title	Details
Never Seen It Coming	Released: June 12, 2015; Hosted by DJ Amaris; Label: DDB; Format: Download
Dexter's Laboratory	Released: October 3, 2015; Hosted by DJ Shon; Label: DDB; Format: Download
Drippy	Released: January 1, 2016; Hosted by DJ Shon; Label: DDB; Format: Download
#OhhMannGoddDamn	Released: March 12, 2016; Label: DDB, Rich Forever Music; Format: Download
Heartbreak Kid	Released: June 12, 2016; Label: DDB, Rich Forever Music; Format: Download
Dexter: The Robot	Released: September 16, 2016; Label: DDB, Rich Forever Music; Format: Download
Different	Released: October 31, 2016; Hosted by DJ Shon; Label: DDB, Rich Forever Music; Format: Download
Read About It	Released: December 25, 2017; Hosted by DJ Shon; Label: Rich Forever Music; Format: Download
Weird Vs. Crazy	Released: August 19, 2019; Hosted by DJ Shon; Label: Rich Forever Music; Format: Digital download
Where's Dexter	Released: June 14, 2020; Label: Rich Forever Music; Format: Digital download
Say What You Want	Released: May 17, 2021; Label: Rich Forever Music; Format: Digital download
Lo$t On Saturn	Released: November 11, 2022; Label: Rich Forever Music; Format: Digital download

=== Collaborative mixtapes ===
List of collaborative mixtapes with details
Title	Mixtape details	Peak chart positions	
Title	Mixtape details	US	US R&B/HH
Rich Forever Music (with Rich Forever Music)	Released: April 4, 2016; Label: Rich Forever Music, Quality Control Music; Format: Digital download	—	—
Rich Forever 2 (with Rich Forever Music)	Released: July 4, 2016; Label: Rich Forever Music, 300 Entertainment, Quality Control Music; Format: Digital download	—	—
The Rich Forever Way (with Rich Forever Music)	Released: March 17, 2017; Label: Rich Forever Music; Format: Digital download	—	—
Rich Forever 3 (with Rich Forever Music)	Released: June 16, 2017; Label: Rich Forever Music, 300 Entertainment; Format: Digital download	93	42
Rich Forever 4 (with Rich Forever Music)	Released: August 2, 2019; Label: Rich Forever Music, 300 Entertainment; Format: Digital download, streaming	170	—
Snotty Nose Dexter (with Chris King)	Released: December 4, 2020; Label: Rich Forever Music, Snotty Nose Records; Format: Digital download, streaming	—	—
"—" denotes a recording that did not chart or was not released in that territory.

=== Singles ===
List of singles as lead artist, with selected chart positions and certifications, showing year released and album name
Title	Year	Peak chart positions				Certifications	Project
Title	Year	US	US R&B/HH	US Rap	CAN	Certifications	Project
"2 Times"	2015	—	—	—	—		Dexter's Laboratory
"Drip from My Walk"	2015	—	—	—	—		Drippy
"Pick It Up" (featuring A$AP Rocky)	2017	54	26	23	60	RIAA: 3× Platinum; BPI: Silver	Dex Meets Dexter
"In the Bank" (featuring YoungBoy Never Broke Again)	2018	—	—	—	—		Non-album single
"Japan"	2018	28	18	14	40	RIAA: 2× Platinum; BPI: Silver	Dex Meets Dexter
"Light" (featuring Drax Project)	2018	—	—	—	—		Dex Meets Dexter
"Nervous" (featuring Lil Baby, Rich The Kid & Jay Critch)	2018	—	—	—	—		Non-album singles
"Fully Loaded" (featuring Lil Gotit)	2019	—	—	—	—		Non-album singles
"Proofread" (featuring Wiz Khalifa)	2019	—	—	—	—		Diana
"What I Like" (featuring Tyga & Rich The Kid)	2020	—	—	—	—		Diana
"Couped Out" (featuring Fivio Foreign)	2020	—	—	—	—		Diana
"—" denotes a recording that did not chart or was not released in that territory.

=== Guest appearances ===
List of non-single guest appearances, with other performing artists, showing year released and album name
Title	Year	Other artist(s)	Project
"Rari"	2016	Carnage, Lil Yachty, Ugly God	—N/a
"Honor Roll"	2016	DJ Twin, Lil Yachty, Sean Kingston	Day 1 EP
"New Wave"	2016	Rich The Kid	Keep Flexin
"Straight Up"	2016	Rich The Kid, Playboi Carti	Keep Flexin
"Real Deal"	2016	Rich The Kid, Migos	Trap Talk
"Coach Cartier"	2017	ASAP Ferg	Still Striving
"Mattress" (Remix)	2017	ASAP Ferg, ASAP Rocky, Playboi Carti, Rich the Kid	Still Striving
"DiegoDexterDuke"	2017	Diego Money, YSL Duke	Diego & Friends
"Hop Out"	2017	Diego Money	Diego & Friends
"New Rage"	2017	Diego Money, Xavier Wulf, Warhol.SS	Diego & Friends
"Made In China"	2017	Higher Brothers	Black Cab
"Pull Up"	2017	Jay Critch	—N/a
"Yukk mouth 2.0"	2017	City Morgue	—N/a
"Digital"	2017	Lil Tracy	XOXO
"Gotcho Bitch"	2017	Lil Wop	Wake-N-Bake
"Cautious"	2017	Rocket Da Goon, Maxo Kream	Pluto Talk
"Blade of Woe"	2017	Trippie Redd	A Love Letter to You
"White"	2017	Rico Nasty	Sugar Trap 2
"Things I Brought"	2017	UnoTheActivist	Live.Shyne.Die
"Zeta Zero 0.5"	2017	6IX9INE, Dalyb, Schlosser	—N/a
"Like a Glock"	2017	Lil Tracy	Tracy's Manga
"ILYSM"	2018	Robb Banks	Molly World
"Eater"	2019	Jay Critch	Talk Money Tape 2
"Do It"	2019	Warhol.SS	M.I.A (EP)
"Fuck This Place Up"	2020	Hayes, Wiktoria	—N/a

== See also ==
- List of people from Harlem
