= Dabbin Fever =

Mixtape by Rich the Kid
- Released: December 24, 2015
- Recorded: 2015
- Genres: Hip hop; trap
- Length: 36:46
- Labels: Quality Control; Rich Forever Music
- Producers: Sledgren; Zaytoven; Murda Beatz; OG Parker; Drumma Boy; DJMoBeatz; MexikoDro

Rich the Kid chronology
Flexin On Purpose (2015)	Dabbin Fever (2015)	Trap Talk (2016)

Dabbin Fever is a mixtape by American rapper Rich The Kid. It was released on December 24, 2015. The mixtape features guest appearances from Wiz Khalifa, Migos, Skippa Da Flippa, HoodRich Pablo Juan, 21 Savage, Jose Guapo and more. The mixtape features production by Sledgren, Zaytoven, Murda Beatz, OG Parker, Drumma Boy, DJMoBeatz and MexikoDro.

== Track listing ==
No.	Title	Producer(s)	Length
1.	"Dabbin Fever (Intro)" (intro)	Sledgren	2:06
2.	"Dab Fever" (featuring Wiz Khalifa)	Zaytoven	2:28
3.	"Feel It"	Murda Beatz	2:47
4.	"Who Dab Is That" (featuring Migos & Skippa Da Flippa)	OG Parker	3:37
5.	"Dab Flu" (featuring Skippa Da Flippa)	Zaytoven	2:18
6.	"That Bag"	Murda Beatz	2:38
7.	"Listen" (featuring Skippa Da Flippa & HoodRich Pablo Juan)	Drumma Boy	3:09
8.	"Migo Gang x Slaughter Gang Music" (featuring Migos, 21 Savage and ManMan Savage)	Zaytoven	4:14
9.	"Rick Owens (Remix)" (featuring Jose Guapo)	BeatsByDBillyXVL	3:29
10.	"Global"	Murda Beatz	3:23
11.	"Plug" (featuring Playboi Carti & Kodak Black)	MexikoDro	4:12
12.	"Nervous" (featuring Curren$y)	DJMoBeatz	2:25
Total length:			36:46
