= Robb Banks =

American rapper (born 1994)

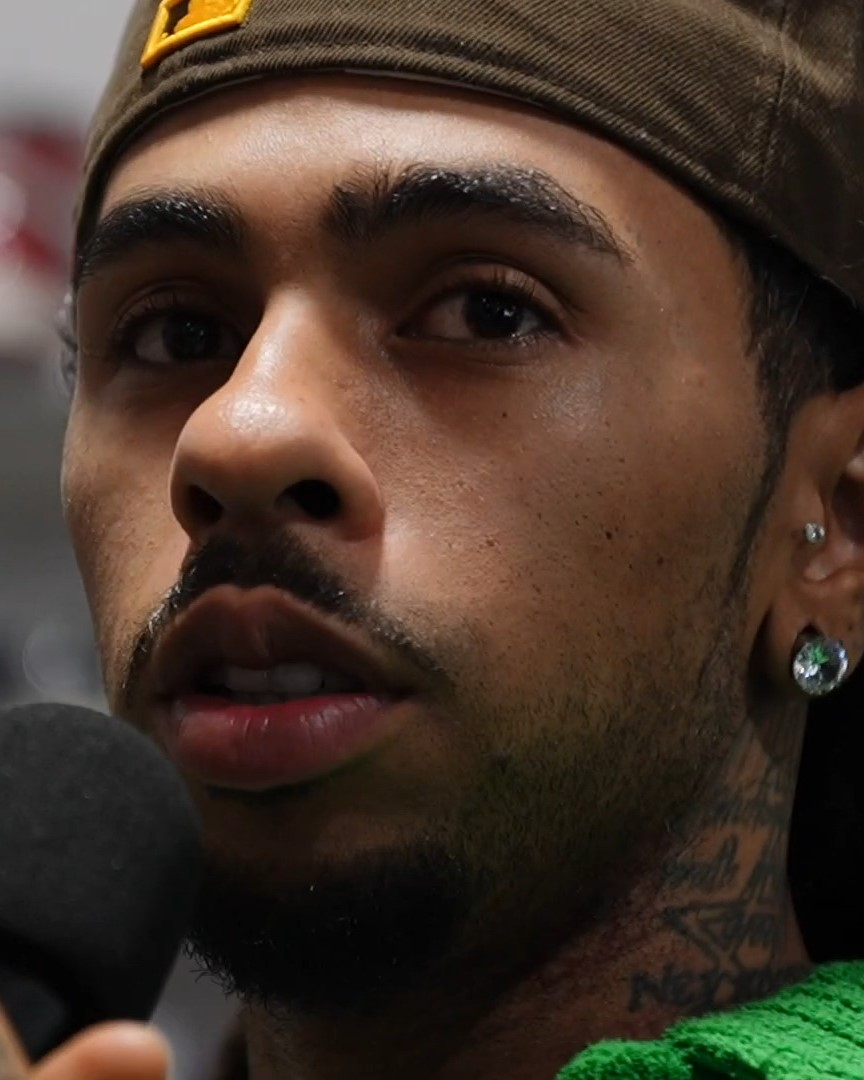
- Banks in 2024

Background information
- Also known as: FEMTO; Young Savage
- Born: Richard O'Neil Burrell; September 24, 1994 (age 32); New York City, U.S.
- Origin: Coral Springs, Florida, U.S.
- Genres: Southern hip-hop; cloud rap
- Occupations: Rapper; singer; songwriter; record producer
- Years active: 2009–present
- Labels: 430 Ent.; New 11 Records; Empire Distribution; 300 Ent.
- Formerly of: Rich Gang; Members Only
- Father: Shaggy
- Website: robbbanks.com

Richard O'Neil Burrell (born September 24, 1994), better known by his stage name Robb Banks (often stylized as Robb Bank$), is an American rapper. Born in New York City and raised in Broward County, Florida, he gained recognition with the Raider Klan movement in 2012. In that year, he released his debut mixtape Calendars and its follow-up, Tha City the following year. He is best known for his association with fellow South Florida-based cloud rap artists, namely XXXTentacion and the group Members Only, as well as his 2013 singles "All the Way Live" and "On Me". He signed with 300 Entertainment to release his debut studio album, Year of the Savage (2015).

Burrell has been described as having an abrasive and brash vocal delivery, with his lyrics and public image containing frequent references or tributes to anime such as Naruto.

== Early life ==
Richard O'Neil Burrell was born on September 24, 1994, in New York City, the oldest child of Carol Johnson and Jamaican reggae artist Shaggy. He spent the first six years of his life in New York City before he and his mother moved to Broward County, Florida. He dropped out of high school his senior year and began working on music.

== Career ==
=== 2011–2012: Calendars and rise to prominence ===
In 2012, after releasing the project Everyday Except Monday, with Matt Meyer Lansky as Tuesday Thru Sunday, and several other songs in 2011, Banks released his debut mixtape Calendars. The solo project predominately consisted of Banks rapping over beats by cloud rap producers including Clams Casino and SBTRKT, with samples from Aaliyah and OutKast. The project became a hit on the microblogging platform Tumblr. He collaborated with producers Nuri and SpaceGhostPurrp and began touring, developing an underground following.

=== 2013: Tha City ===
After a brief hiatus, Robb began working on another project titled Tha City. He promoted the mixtape by releasing singles off the project including "Practice", "All the Way Live", and "On Me". Tha City was released on October 1, 2013. Prior to the release of this tape rumors had surfaced as to whether or not Shaggy was Robb's father, a fact that was formerly denied, but was soon confirmed by him to be true by making the cover for Tha City an old family photo of Banks and Shaggy. After the release of this mixtape, Robb went on a year-long hiatus as he continued touring and spreading his music around the world.

=== 2014–2015: 2PhoneShawty, No Trespassing and Year of the Savage ===
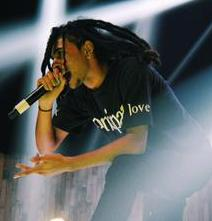
Robb Banks performing at Summerfest in 2015

Throughout 2014, Robb began touring around the world and rarely released new music, only to show that he is still working on Year of the Savage. This was until the end of the year, when he began hinting new projects that have been in the work. In December, Banks put out the first (promotional) single for his debut commercial release, called "2PhoneShawty". It ended up being the only song recorded in 2013 on the entire album.

In 2015, he started working on a new batch of music for YOTS, which would mainly feature production from his new affiliate Nuez. In April, Robb released two extended-plays: 2PhoneShawty and No Trespassing. The 2PhoneShawty EP consisted of outtakes from Year of the Savage, and No Trespassing was a collaboration between him and Memphis-born rapper Chris Travis, all recorded in 2014.

On August 13, 2015, Banks released the lead single for his album, titled "Pressure". After that he continued to promote YOTS by releasing a bunch of freestyled tracks. It was during one of these freestyles ("Throw It Up") that he confirmed the release date for his long-awaited album.

On October 2, 2015, Robb Banks released Year of the Savage through 300 Entertainment's Dorian Distribution.

=== 2016–2017: C2: Death of My Teenage and Rich Gang ===
On September 27, 2016, Banks released a sequel to "Calendars" titled "C2: Death of My Teenage" which featured guest appearances from Los Hosale and XXXTentacion, co-founder of Members Only, a hip hop collective he would later join. The mixtape was preceded by the release of the single "BETT".

Following the release of the mixtape, Robb embarked on a tour of the same name, which was to feature fellow South Florida rappers Ski Mask the Slump God, Wifisfuneral and Ronny J., New Jersey's Da$h, and Chicago's Warhol.SS were also set to open. Before the tour began, however, Da$h was arrested, causing him to be dropped from the tour.

In early January 2017, it was announced by Cash Money Records founder Birdman that Banks was the newest member of the label's Rich Gang subsidiary. Robb later confirmed that while he was a part of Rich Gang, he would continue to be an independent artist, choosing not to sign with Cash Money.

At this time, Banks also took to Twitter to announce a new project titled "Falconia", a sequel to his sophomore effort "Tha City".

On September 26, 2017, Banks released EP "Cloverfield 2.0" Months later, on December 27, 2017, he dropped another EP called "2: Pillz".

=== 2018–2019: Molly World, Cloverfield 3 and Road to Falconia ===
On February 12, 2018, Banks released single "A Milli (4 M's)" and announced the upcoming release of "No Rooftops 2: Reloaded". Weeks later Banks would release a mixtape titled "Molly World" through Empire Distribution on March 9, 2018. Track 14 of "Molly World" "Let Da Beat Build" was made part of Cash Money's "Before Anythang" Documentary Soundtrack. On April 7, 2018, Bank$ and Wifisfuneral released lead single "EA" from their early 2019 collaborative project.

On April 27, 2018, Banks announced that his long rumored project Falconia will be arriving sometime in summer 2018. However, the date was delayed yet again.

On August 17, 2018, the third part of his Cloverfield series dropped, mainly consisting of quality Falconia outtakes.

Later in 2019, after the January 11 joint effort with Wifi, Robb released "Road to Falconia" on December 13, 2019, which now serves as the full-length prelude to his long-awaited debut.

=== 2020–2021: No Rooftops 2, The Leak (Vol. 1 and 2), and Few Pillz ===
On April 16, 2020, Banks released his sequel tape to "No Rooftops" called "No Rooftops 2". This mixtape included beats from the early 2000s as well as few original instrumentals.

Later that year Robb dropped a two-part project titled "Tha Leak", with the first part being almost entirely mixtape original songs, and the second being various leftover material tracks from the same year.

On April 19, 2021, Banks released the EP "Few Pillz", which acts as the sequel to 2017's "2 Pillz".

=== 2022–present: Falconia ===
A year after his last project, on April 30, 2022, Robb released "Falconia", his most anticipated body of work yet, as a single project with 17 songs. While on June 23, 2022, followed the album's deluxe version titled "Falcon of the Millennium", with 10 additional tracks, including the song "Outside".

== Influences ==
Banks' style is notorious for its heavy sampling of old school R&B, pop culture and Japanese anime. Robb states his inspiration to rap comes from Biggie Smalls and that one of his favorite artists of all time is British quiet storm-style singer Sade. Robb has also mentioned Lil' Wayne, Webbie, SpaceGhostPurrp, his father and Slug as an influence to his sound. His tag "I Think I Might Be Happy" is synonymous with his music and is taken from a scene of the U.S. version of Skins. Banks frequently makes references to Japanese anime Naruto and calls it his favorite anime of all time. Banks also refers to himself as "Femto" from the Japanese manga, Berserk.

== Discography ==
=== Albums ===
- Year of the Savage (2015)
- Falconia (2022)
- Falcon of the Millennium - Falconia Deluxe (2022)

=== Collaborative albums ===
- Members Only, Vol. 4 (2019) (as part of Members Only)

=== Mixtapes ===
- Calendars (2012)
- Tha City (2013)
- No Rooftops (2016)
- C2: Death of My Teenage (2016)
- Members Only, Vol. 3 (2017) (as part of Members Only)
- Molly World (2018)
- Cloverfield 3 (2018)
- Connected (2019) (with Wifisfuneral)
- Road to Falconia (2019)
- No Rooftops 2 (2020)
- Tha Leak, Pt. 1 (2020)
- Tha Leak 2 (2020)
- I Don't Text Back I Don't Call (2023)
- I Can't Feel My Face Too (2023) (with Tony Shhnow)
- I Think I Might Be Happy, Pt. 1 (2024)
- I Think I Might Be Happy, Pt. 2 (2024)
- Tha Leak 3 (2025)
- Rich Badness (2026)
- Unhappy – Side A (2026)
- Unhappy – Side B (TBA)

=== EPs ===
- 2PhoneShawty (2015)
- No Trespassing (2015) (with Chris Travis)
- Cloverfield 2.0 (2017)
- 2 Pillz (2017)
- 100 Year War (Golden Age) (2018)
- Few Pillz (2021)
- Tha SSettication (2023)

=== Singles ===
- "Practice" (2013) (with Sir Michael Rocks)
- "All the Way Live" (2013)
- "On Me" (2013)
- "2PhoneShawty" (2014)
- "24/7" (2015) (with IndigoChildRick)
- "Solid" (2015) (with Chris Travis)
- "Pressure" (2015)
- "BETT" (2016)
- "ILYSM" (2017) (with Famous Dex)
- "Can't Feel My Face" (2019) (with Wifisfuneral)
- "Hentai" (2019)
- "Shootout" (2022) (with Lil Uzi Vert)
- "Lifted" (2022) (with Trippie Redd)
- "Baby Tunechi" (2023)
- "Back on My Grizzy" (2023)
- "My Bleed" (2023)
- "Kase" (2024)
- "Do the Most" (2024)
- "PB&J" (2024) (with SpaceGhostPurrp)
- "No Problem" (2024)
- "Five/Six" (2024)
- "Ask Them Hoes" (2025)
- "Stop Snitchin" (2025)
- "Hurting" (2026)
- "Bang Den" (2026) (featuring SpaceGhostPurrp)
