= New Freezer =

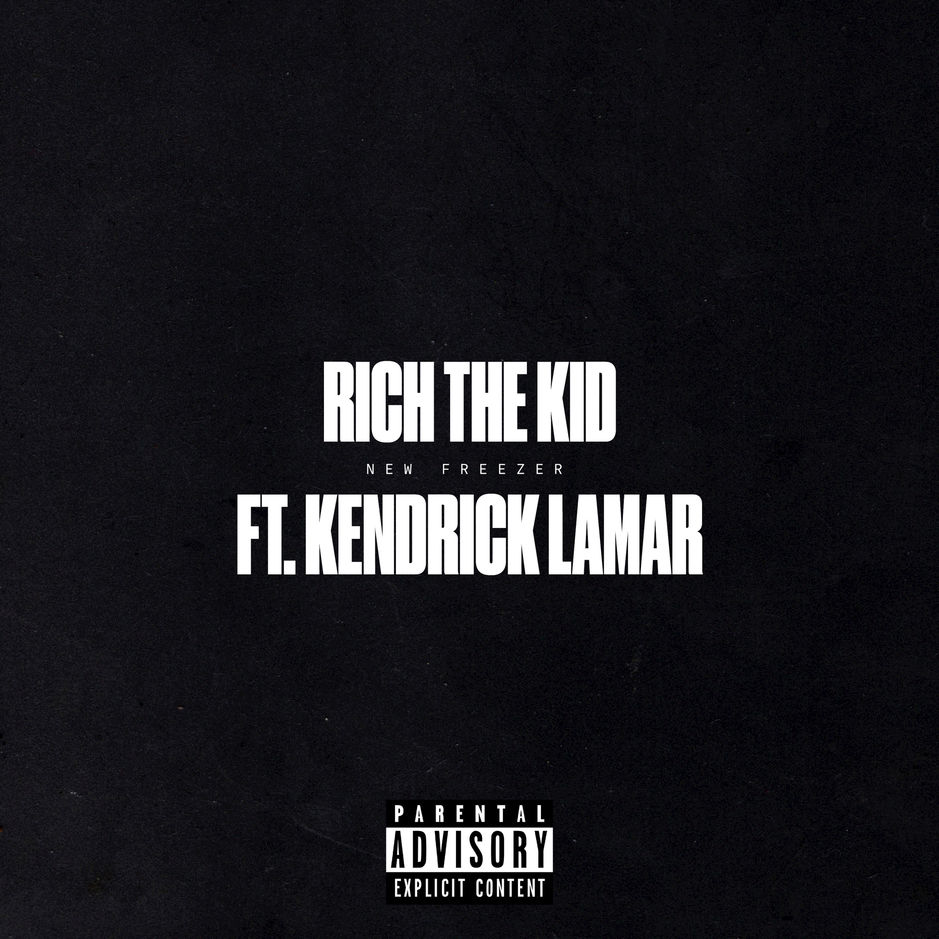

Single by Rich the Kid featuring Kendrick Lamar

from the album The World Is Yours
- Released: September 26, 2017
- Recorded: 2016–17
- Genre: Hip hop; trap
- Length: 3:14
- Label: Interscope
- Songwriters: Dimitri Roger; Kendrick Duckworth; Ben Jayne
- Producer: Ben Jayne

Rich the Kid singles chronology
"Cookies & Sherbert" (2017)	"New Freezer" (2017)	"Plug Walk" (2018)

Kendrick Lamar singles chronology
"Loyalty" (2017)	"New Freezer" (2017)	"Love" (2017)

Music video
- "New Freezer" on YouTube

"New Freezer" is a song by American rapper Rich the Kid featuring fellow American rapper Kendrick Lamar, released on September 26. 2017. Written alongside producer Ben Jayne, it was released as the lead single from Rich the Kid's debut album The World Is Yours (2018). The original version featured A$AP Ferg and MadeinTYO. A$AP Ferg revealed in 2019 that Lamar agreed to feature on the track on the condition that he would be the only feature.

== Background ==
The song's demo surfaced online in September 2017, shortly before the final version with Kendrick Lamar was released. Rapper A$AP Ferg who was originally featured on the song was later excluded, and he revealed in August 2019 that Lamar insisted on being the only feature on the song if it were to be released. Ferg said, however, he was happy the song catapulted Rich the Kid's career in the end.

== Critical reception ==
Natalie Maher of Billboard called the song a "head-snapping cut".

== Live performances ==
The artists performed the song live at the 2018 Brit Awards, with Lamar standing on top of a glass box as Rich smashed a luxury car in front of the crowd.

== Remix ==
Lil Wayne and Gudda Gudda recorded a remix of the song for Wayne's mixtape Dedication 6.

== Charts ==
=== Weekly charts ===
Chart (2017–18)	Peak position
Canada Hot 100 (Billboard)	66
US Billboard Hot 100	41
US Hot R&B/Hip-Hop Songs (Billboard)	20
US Rhythmic Airplay (Billboard)	40

=== Year-end charts ===
Chart (2018)	Position
US Hot R&B/Hip-Hop Songs (Billboard)	54

== Certifications ==
Region	Certification	Certified units/sales
Canada (Music Canada)	Platinum	80,000^{‡}
New Zealand (RMNZ)	Gold	15,000^{‡}
United Kingdom (BPI)	Silver	200,000^{‡}
United States (RIAA)	3× Platinum	3,000,000^{‡}
^{‡} Sales+streaming figures based on certification alone.

== Release history ==
Region	Date	Format	Label(s)	Ref.
United States	September 26, 2017	Digital download	Interscope; Rich Forever Music	
United States	November 21, 2017	Rhythmic contemporary	Interscope	
