= Keep Flexin =

Mixtape by Rich the Kid
- Released: October 31, 2016
- Recorded: 2016
- Genres: Hip hop; trap
- Length: 41:20
- Labels: Quality Control; Rich Forever Music
- Producers: DJ Durel; Lab Cook; Danny Wolf; Gnealz; Maaly Raw; Retro Sushi; Rich the Kid; Honorable C.N.O.T.E.

Rich the Kid chronology
| Rich Forever 2 (2016) | Keep Flexin (2016) | The Rich Forever Way (2017) |

Professional ratings
Review scores
| Source | Rating |
|---|---|
| Pitchfork | (6.5/10) |

Keep Flexin is a mixtape by American rapper Rich the Kid. It was released on October 31, 2016. The mixtape features guest appearances from rappers Desiigner, Migos, Young Thug, Famous Dex, Playboi Carti and Jeremih. The mixtape features production by Rich The Kid himself, DJ Durel, Lab Cook, Maaly Raw, Danny Wolf, Retro Sushi and Honorable C.N.O.T.E.

== Track listing ==
| No. | Title | Producer(s) | Length |
|---|---|---|---|
| 1. | "I Don't Care" | DJ Durel | 2:53 |
| 2. | "BM" | Lab Cook | 3:06 |
| 3. | "New Wave" (featuring Famous Dex) | CeeJ of Retro Sushi | 2:14 |
| 4. | "Greedy" (featuring Jeremih) | | 3:08 |
| 5. | "Don't Want Her" | DJ Durel | 3:20 |
| 6. | "Blessings" | Lab Cook | 3:23 |
| 7. | "Doors Up" | Danny Wolf | 3:27 |
| 8. | "Dat Way" (featuring Migos) | Honorable C.N.O.T.E. | 5:05 |
| 9. | "Liar Liar" | Maaly Raw | 2:45 |
| 10. | "Ran It Up" (featuring Young Thug) | Rich the Kid | 3:35 |
| 11. | "Going" (featuring Desiigner and Quavo) | DJ Durel | 5:00 |
| 12. | "Str8 Up" (featuring Playboi Carti and Famous Dex) | Gnealz | 3:24 |
| Total length: | | | 41:20 |
