= Flexxin on Purpose =

Mixtape by Rich the Kid
- Released: August 31, 2015
- Recorded: 2015
- Genres: Hip hop; trap
- Length: 35.38
- Labels: Quality Control; Rich Forever
- Producers: Cassius Jay; Harry Fraud; Hit-Boy; Murda Beatz; OG Parker; Ty Dolla Sign; Zaytoven

Rich the Kid chronology
Flexxin on Purpose (2015)	Dabbin Fever (2015)

Flexxin on Purpose is a mixtape by American rapper Rich the Kid. It was released on August 31, 2015, by Quality Control Music and Rich Forever Music. The mixtape features guest appearances from Young Dolph, Ty Dolla Sign, Fetty Wap and Rich Homie Quan. The mixtape features production by Cassius Jay, Harry Fraud. Hit-Boy, Murda Beatz, OG Parker and Zaytoven.

== Track listing ==
No.	Title	Producer(s)	Length
1.	"Master P (Intro)"	Harry Fraud	0:52
2.	"Expensive"	Harry Fraud	3:09
3.	"That Bag"	Murda Beatz	2:38
4.	"No Ceilings"	Cassius Jay	2:41
5.	"Bands In The Bank" (featuring Young Dolph)	Cassius Jay	3:51
6.	"She Flexin"	OG Parker	3:19
7.	"Where The Cash At"	Hit-Boy	1:56
8.	"Tell Me What You Like" (featuring Ty Dolla Sign)	Ty Dolla Sign	3:21
9.	"Championship"	Murda Beatz	3:00
10.	"Keep It 100" (featuring Fetty Wap)	Zaytoven	3:11
11.	"Sick Wit It"	Zaytoven	2:06
12.	"What You Been Doin'"	Cassius Jay	2:44
13.	"She Aint Goin'" (featuring Rich Homie Quan)	Zaytoven	2:59
14.	"Check Out The Dab"	Zaytoven	2:31
Total length:			35.38

Sample credits

- "Expensive" contains elements of "Everything Is Expensive", written and performed by Esthero.
