= Feelin' Like Tunechi =

2021 single by Lil Wayne and Rich the Kid

Single by Lil Wayne and Rich the Kid

from the album Trust Fund Babies
- Released: October 1, 2021
- Length: 3:06
- Label: Young Money; Republic; Rostrum
- Songwriters: Dwayne Carter, Jr.; Dimitri Roger; Grant Dickinson
- Producer: The Lab Cook

Lil Wayne singles chronology
"Thought I Was Gonna Stop" (2021)	"Feelin' Like Tunechi" (2021)	"Ya Dig" (2021)

Rich the Kid singles chronology
"Prada (Remix)" (2021)	"Feelin' Like Tunechi" (2021)	"Racks on Me" (2021)

Music video
- "Feelin' Like Tunechi" on YouTube

"Feelin' Like Tunechi" is a song by American rappers Lil Wayne and Rich the Kid from their collaborative mixtape Trust Fund Babies, released on October 1, 2021. It was produced by The Lab Cook.

== Composition ==
The song features Latin-inspired production and finds the rappers giving their appreciation of each other's lifestyles.

== Critical reception ==
The song received generally positive reviews from critics. Critics have considered the song a good start to the mixtape Trust Fund Babies. Abou Kamara of The Ringer wrote that it "perfectly harnesses the Lethal Weapon buddy-cop potential between the duo". In a Pitchfork review of Trust Fund Babies, Alphonse Pierre negatively reviewed the song, writing that Rich the Kid "continues to have no identity of his own, switching between that tired triplet flow and a lazy Young Thug impersonation throughout (most egregiously on the chorus of "Feelin' Like Tunechi")".

== Music video ==
An accompanying music video was directed by Arrad. It opens with the rappers driving to an alleyway in a red McLaren, and cuts to a spoof of the video of Lil Wayne's 2012 deposition.

== Charts ==
Chart (2021)	Peak position
New Zealand Hot Singles (RMNZ)	31
US Billboard Hot 100	91
US Hot R&B/Hip-Hop Songs (Billboard)	40
