= Rich Than Famous =

Mixtape by Rich the Kid
- Released: December 25, 2014
- Recorded: 2014
- Genres: Hip hop; trap
- Length: 40:35
- Labels: Quality Control; Rich Forever Music
- Producers: Harry Fraud; K.E. on the Track; Deko; OG Parker; Jahlil Beats; Metro Boomin; Murda Beatz; Nas Beats; Zaytoven; Spiffy

Rich Than Famous is a mixtape by American rapper Rich the Kid. It was released on December 25, 2014. The mixtape features guest appearances from YG, Migos, Bobby Shmurda, Rowdy Rebel, Gucci Mane, Peewee Longway and Johny Cinco. The mixtape features production by Darkside Productions, Harry Fraud, K.E. on the Track, Deko, OG Parker, Jahlil Beats, Metro Boomin, Murda Beatz, Ralph Beats, Zaytoven and Spiffy.

== Track listing ==
No.	Title	Producer(s)	Length
1.	"Rich Than Famous" (Intro)	Harry Fraud	1:36
2.	"Goin Krazy (Remix)" (featuring YG)	K.E. on the Track	2:54
3.	"From The Streets"	Deko; OG Parker	3:04
4.	"Don't Love You"	Jahlil Beats	2:06
5.	"Quit Playin"	Deko; OG Parker	2:39
6.	"Wrist Gone Crazy"	Jahlil Beats	2:46
7.	"Ain't Workin Dat Move" (featuring Migos)	Nas Beats	3:46
8.	"Trap Still Jumpin"	Metro Boomin; Murda Beatz	2:50
9.	"Buy U Diamonds"	Deko; OG Parker	3:37
10.	"On My Way" (featuring Bobby Shmurda & Rowdy Rebel)	Zaytoven	4:21
11.	"Trap (Remix)" (featuring Gucci Mane)	Zaytoven	3:28
12.	"Work For it"	Zaytoven	3:02
13.	"Why Would U Not (Bonus)" (featuring Peewee Longway & Johnny Cinco)	Spiffy	4:26
Total length:			40:35
