= Rich Forever 3 =

Mixtape by Rich Forever Music
- Released: June 16, 2017
- Length: 36:43
- Labels: Rich Forever Music; 300
- Producers: Rich the Kid (exec.); Lab Cook; Richie Souf; Laron; 808 Shawty

Rich Forever Music chronology
The Rich Forever Way (2017)	Rich Forever 3 (2017)	Rich Forever 4 (2019)

Rich the Kid chronology
The Rich Forever Way (2017)	Rich Forever 3 (2017)	The World Is Yours (2018)

Famous Dex chronology
Different (2016)	Rich Forever 3 (2017)	Read About It (2017)

Jay Critch chronology
The Rich Forever Way (2017)	Rich Forever 3 (2017)	Talk Money Tape (2018)

Rich Forever 3 is the fourth compilation mixtape by American record label, Rich Forever Music, released on June 16, 2017. The mixtape was delayed multiple times. The production was handled by The Lab Cook, Richie Souf, Laron & 808Shawty. It is the third mixtape of the Rich Forever series.

Rich Forever 3 debuted at number 93 on the US Billboard 200.

== Track listing ==
Rich Forever 3
No.	Title	Producer(s)	Length
1.	"Pardon Me" (Famous Dex, Rich The Kid & Jay Critch)	The Lab Cook	3:14
2.	"Loose It" (Jay Critch, Famous Dex & Rich The Kid)	The Lab Cook	3:56
3.	"You Flexin'" (Rich The Kid, Jay Critch & Famous Dex)	The Lab Cook	3:06
4.	"No Noise" (Famous Dex & Rich The Kid)	The Lab Cook	3:16
5.	"VVS" (Jay Critch, Rich The Kid & Famous Dex)	Laron	3:02
6.	"Read About It" (Famous Dex, Jay Critch & Rich The Kid)	Richie Souf	3:08
7.	"Nintendo" (Jay Critch & Rich The Kid)	Laron	2:54
8.	"Moon Walkin'" (Rich The Kid, Jay Critch & Famous Dex)	The Lab Cook	4:10
9.	"Did It Again (Remix)" (Jay Critch & Rich The Kid)	808Shawty	4:24
10.	"I Don't Answer" (Famous Dex, Rich The Kid & Jay Critch)	Richie Souf	2:52
11.	"Rich Forever Way (Outro)" (Rich The Kid, Jay Critch & Famous Dex)	The Lab Cook	2:41
Total length:			36:43
