= Trust Fund Babies =

Mixtape by Lil Wayne and Rich the Kid
- Released: October 1, 2021
- Genre: Hip-hop
- Length: 28:33
- Labels: Young Money; Republic; Rostrum
- Producers: 808 Jayy; Bloublood; Cheese; Diem; Greedo; Hurt; Jason "Diet" Silver; Koncept P; Lab Cook; LunchMoney Lewis; MonstaBeatz; Murda Beatz; Smash David; Swauv; Swede; Tay Keith; Timothy on the Beat; Wavy Wes; West

Lil Wayne chronology
No Ceilings 3 (2020)	Trust Fund Babies (2021)	I Am Music (2023)

Rich the Kid chronology
Lucky 7 (2021)	Trust Fund Babies (2021)

Singles from Trust Fund Babies
- 1. "Feelin' Like Tunechi" Released: October 1, 2021

Trust Fund Babies is a collaborative mixtape by American rappers Lil Wayne and Rich the Kid. It was released on October 1, 2021, by Young Money Entertainment, Republic Records, and Rostrum Records. It contains a sole guest appearance by American rapper YG. The mixtape's lead single, "Feelin' Like Tunechi", was released alongside the mixtape.

== Critical reception ==
Professional ratings
Review scores
Source	Rating
AllMusic	3/5 stars
Exclaim	8/10
HipHopDX	2.4/5
Pitchfork	4.9/10
The Spectrum	2.5/5

Trust Fund Babies received mixed reviews from music critics. Anthony Malone of HipHopDX criticized the lack of chemistry between the two rappers, writing: "Instead of trading bars and witty wordplay to keep the momentum going, verses are thrown together in a sequence that feels boring and uninspired." He concluded, "Trust Fund Babies doesn't succeed much at all, but it does create anticipation for Wayne's next solo work and further shows that even in his late 30s, Wayne can still rap circles around Great Value rappers." Alphonse Pierre of Pitchfork criticized Rich the Kid's performance, although he felt that the project contained some Lil Wayne's best rapping in years, writing: "The only reason to care about this mixtape is Wayne, even if it often sounds like he's being held captive in a studio by Rich and has to rap his way out [...] After years of health scares, label issues, and the depressingly awful raps between I Am Not a Human Being II and Free Weezy Album, it's just nice to hear Wayne rap adequately again."

== Commercial performance ==
"Trust Fund Babies" debuted at number 35 on the US Billboard 200 chart, moving approximately 15,000 units first week.

== Track listing ==
No.	Title	Writer(s)	Producer(s)	Length
1.	"Feelin' Like Tunechi"	Dwayne Michael Carter Jr.; Dimitri Leslie Roger; Grant Dickinson	The Lab Cook	3:06
2.	"Headlock"	Carter; Julian Bohorquez; Gamal Lewis; Roger; Brian White	LunchMoney Lewis	3:01
3.	"Trust Fund"	Carter; Brytavious Lakeith Chambers; Roger	Tay Keith	2:46
4.	"Admit It"	Carter; Lewis; David A. Marcus; Roger; Jason Silber	Diem; Jason "Diet" Silber; LunchMoney Lewis	2:10
5.	"Shh"	Carter; Rob Curti; James Zachary Martinez; Paul Penso; Roger; Nikolai Siebers	808 Jayy; Greedo; Koncept P; Swede	2:46
6.	"Big Boss"	Khalil Barrett; Isaiah Blouir; Carter; Aaron Gilfenbain; Jason Goldberg; Tom Insana; Roger	Bloublood; Cheese; Hurt; Swauv; West	2:32
7.	"Still"	Carter; Shane Lindstrom; Roger	Murda Beatz	2:43
8.	"Bleedin'"	Carter; John Fitch; Daryl Harleaux; Roger	MonstaBeatz	3:06
9.	"Buzzin'" (featuring YG)	Carter; Goldberg; Keenon Jackson; Samuel Jimenez; Roger	Cheese; Smash David	3:18
10.	"Yeah Yeah"	Wesley Kouamu Attipou; Carter; Dickinson; Goldberg; Timothy Levtsenyuk; Roger	Lab Cook; Timothy on the Beat; Wavy Wes	3:05
Total length:				28:33

== Charts ==
Chart performance for Trust Fund Babies
Chart (2021)	Peak position
US Billboard 200	35
