= Trap Talk =

Mixtape by Rich the Kid
- Released: April 19, 2016
- Genres: Hip-hop; trap
- Length: 43:30
- Labels: Quality Control; Rich Forever Music; 300
- Producers: Chase Beats; Chris Fresh; Danny Wolf; Harry Fraud; Lab Cook; MexikoDro; OG Parker; PartyNextDoor; Sledgren; Ty Dolla Sign; Zaytoven

Rich the Kid chronology
Rich Forever Music (2016)	Trap Talk (2016)	Rich Forever 2 (2016)

Singles from Trap Talk
- 1. "Plug" Released: November 17, 2015

Trap Talk is the sixth mixtape released by American rapper Rich the Kid. It was released on April 19, 2016, by Quality Control Music, Rich Forever Music, and 300 Entertainment. Trap Talk includes guest appearances from Ty Dolla $ign, Migos, 21 Savage, and others. It is available on music streaming platforms, such as SoundCloud. The song "Plug" was the only single that was released in November 2015 and made it on the mixtape.

== Critical reception ==
Professional ratings
Review scores
Source	Rating
HotNewHipHop	4.5/5

HotNewHipHop gave the mixtape a 4.5 star rating out of 5.

== Track listing ==
No.	Title	Producer(s)	Length
1.	"Just Might"	Lab Cook	3:24
2.	"Trap House" (featuring 21 Savage)	Chris Fresh	2:41
3.	"The Nawf"	Chase Beats	2:41
4.	"That's Right"	Lab Cook	3:13
5.	"Just For You"	OG Parker	3:12
6.	"Running Threw It"	Lab Cook	3:04
7.	"911" (featuring Ty Dolla Sign)	Ty Dolla Sign	3:16
8.	"Smash"	Zaytoven	2:41
9.	"Plug" (featuring Playboi Carti and Kodak Black)	MexikoDro	4:12
10.	"Got Rich"	Danny Wolf	3:04
11.	"Real Deal" (featuring Migos and Famous Dex)	Chris Fresh	3:57
12.	"Outro"	Harry Fraud	3:19
13.	"Routine Rouge" (with PartyNextDoor featuring Ty Dolla Sign)	PartyNextDoor	4:46
Total length:			43:30
