= Boss Man (album) =

Studio album by Rich the Kid
- Released: March 13, 2020
- Studios: Fever Recording; Windmark Recording; Off Road Rec; Future History; Electric Feel, West Hollywood, California; Chalice Recording
- Length: 44:13
- Labels: Rich Forever; Republic
- Producers: 1Mind; Austin Powerz; Axl; Beat by Jeff; Carter Lang; Cubeatz; DeeMoney; DJ Moon; Dre Moon; DY; Jacob Reske; KC Supreme; L.N.K; London on da Track; Leland; Marcel Korkutata; Mario Petersen; Murda Beatz; Post Malone; Rekless; Rich The Kid; SkipOnDaBeat; Smash David; Tenroc; Vanriper; Westen Weiss

Rich the Kid chronology
The World Is Yours 2 (2019)	Boss Man (2020)	Nobody Safe (2020)

Singles from Boss Man
- 1. "That's Tuff" Released: December 6, 2019; 2. "Money Talk" Released: January 17, 2020; 3. "Red" Released: March 6, 2020; 4. "Stuck Together" Released: April 1, 2020

Boss Man (stylised in all caps) is the third studio album by American rapper Rich the Kid. It was released on March 13, 2020. It is Rich's only studio album on Republic Records. The album features guest appearances by Lil Baby, DaBaby, Nicki Minaj, Post Malone, Lil Tjay, YoungBoy Never Broke Again, London on da Track, and Quavo. It is reportedly the first part of a two-part project.

Professional ratings
Review scores
Source	Rating
Allmusic	3.5/5 stars

== Background ==
Rich shared a countdown on Instagram on February 14, 2020; he had previously announced a new album would come out in March. He then revealed the cover with the written release date on March 3, and revealed the tracklist on March 12. Rich also revealed "V12" from the album features Post Malone and was also solely produced by Malone. Rich the Kid and Tidal held a listening party for the album in New York City on March 12.

== Singles ==
The lead single of the album is "That's Tuff", featuring Quavo. It was released on December 6, 2019. The lead single was originally thought to be "Go Up", featuring Roddy Ricch, a track that was released on July 12, 2019, to celebrate Rich's 27th birthday, which was the day after the release of the song. The second single of the album is "Money Talk", featuring YoungBoy Never Broke Again. It was released on January 17, 2020. The third single of the album is "Red". It was released on March 6, 2020. The fourth single is "Stuck Together", featuring Lil Baby. It was made as a single on April 1, 2020, due to a remix also including Future.

== Track listing ==
Credits adapted from the album's liner notes.

Boss Man track listing
No.	Title	Writer(s)	Producer(s)	Length
1.	"Far from You"	Dimitri Roger; Austin Schindler; Jacob Reske	Austin Powerz; Reske	2:26
2.	"Stuck Together" (featuring Lil Baby and Future)	Roger; Dominique Jones; Nayvadius Wilburn; Dwan Avery; Andre Proctor	DY; Dre Moon	2:57
3.	"Ray Charles"	Roger; Jefferson Ogendi	Rich the Kid; Beat by Jeff	1:52
4.	"Sick" (featuring DaBaby)	Roger; Jonathan Kirk; Samuel Jimenez; Sebastian Lopez	Smash David; 1Mind	1:57
5.	"Not Sorry" (featuring Nicki Minaj)	Roger; Onika Maraj; Jimenez; Derrick Milano	Smash David	2:17
6.	"Red"	Roger; Ogendi	Beat by Jeff	2:12
7.	"V12" (featuring Post Malone)	Roger; Austin Post	Post Malone	3:02
8.	"For That"	Roger; Ogendi	Beat by Jeff	1:41
9.	"Depend on Me" (featuring Lil Tjay)	Roger; Tione Merritt; Shane Lindstrom; Marcel Korkutata	Murda Beatz; Mars	2:31
10.	"Easy"	Roger; Manalla Yusuf; Tim Gomringer; Kevin Gomringer	Axl; Cubeatz	1:45
11.	"About My Business"	Roger; Ogendi	Beat by Jeff	2:16
12.	"No Loyalty"	Roger; Avery; Proctor; Corey Moon	DY; DJ Moon	2:06
13.	"Ain't No Doubts"	Roger; Carter Lang; Westen Weiss; Kyle Van Riper; London Holmes	London on da Track; Lang; Van Riper; Westen Weiss	2:23
14.	"You"	Roger; Jason Cornet; Kim Candilora	Tenroc; KC Supreme	2:59
15.	"Racks On" (featuring YoungBoy Never Broke Again)	Roger; Kentrell Gaulden; Jefferson Ogendi; David Karbal; Daniel Shyman	Beat by Jeff; DY; Thats Not It	2:57
16.	"I Want Mo" (with London on da Track)	Roger; London Holmes; Weiss; Lang; Van Riper	London on da Track; Lang; Van Riper; Weiss	2:06
17.	"Over With"	Roger; Lopez; Jimenez; Gabriel Tavarez; Edgar Ferrera; Thomas Klingensmith	1Mind; Smash David; SkipOnDaBeat; Rekless; Leland	2:03
18.	"That's Tuff" (featuring Quavo)	Roger; Quavious Marshall; Darius Lassiter; Mario Petersen; Leon Krol	DeeMoney; Petersen; L.N.K	2:33
19.	"Money Talk" (featuring YoungBoy Never Broke Again)	Roger; Gaulden; Avery; Darion Clark	DY; Velli Clark^{[a]}	2:55
20.	"Stuck Together" (featuring Lil Baby)	Roger; Jones; Avery; Proctor	DY; Dre Moon	2:12
Total length:				46:25

Notes

- ^{^[a]} signifies a co-producer

== Personnel ==
Credits adapted from the album's liner notes.

Musicians

- The Choke – trumpet (track 3)

Technical

- Lloyd "2Fly" Mizell – recording (track 1)
- Brandon Wood – recording assistant (track 3)
- Ian Gagnon – recording (track 4)
- Aubry Delaine – recording (track 5)
- Mate Gere – recording assistant (track 10)
- Christian Amadeus – recording assistant (track 16)
- Jason Goldberg – mixing (tracks 1, 9, 12, 17), recording (tracks 2–19)
- Thomas "Tillie" Mann – mixing (tracks 2–11, 13–16, 18, 19)
- Princeton "Perfect Harmony" Terry – mixing assistant (tracks 2–8, 10, 11, 13–16, 18, 19)
- Kamron Krieger – mixing assistant (track 9)
- Mike Bozzi – mastering (all tracks)

== Charts ==
Chart performance for Boss Man
Chart (2020)	Peak position
Belgian Albums (Ultratop Flanders)	188
Belgian Albums (Ultratop Wallonia)	182
Canadian Albums (Billboard)	28
French Albums (SNEP)	119
US Billboard 200	24
US Top R&B/Hip-Hop Albums (Billboard)	17
