= Plug Walk =

Single by Rich the Kid

from the album The World Is Yours
- Released: February 9, 2018
- Recorded: 2017
- Genre: Hip hop; trap
- Length: 2:55
- Label: Interscope
- Songwriters: Dimitri Roger; Grant Dickinson
- Producer: Lab Cook

Rich the Kid singles chronology
"New Freezer" (2017)	"Plug Walk" (2018)	"Dead Friends" (2018)

Music video
- "Plug Walk" on YouTube

"Plug Walk" is a hip-hop song by American rapper Rich the Kid, released as the second single to his debut album The World Is Yours (2018). The song, produced by The Lab Cook, was premiered through Zane Lowe's Beats 1 radio program on February 9, 2018. The song was Rich the Kid's highest-charting song on the Billboard Hot 100, until the release of "Carnival" in 2024.

== Music video ==
A music video for the song, directed by DAPS, was released on March 4, 2018. The video pays homage to the television show Breaking Bad and features Rich the Kid cooking up chemicals in an RV with an alien also known as Lil Mayo in the middle of the desert. Since its release, the music video has received over 344 million views on YouTube as of April 2024.

== Remixes ==
On April 3, 2018, an unofficial remix was released by rappers Jadakiss and Nino Man. Another unofficial remix was released by rapper 6ix9ine called "Blood Walk". Four weeks prior to the remix being released, Rich posted a picture on his Instagram account teasing the official album cover for the official remix. The official remix featuring rappers Gucci Mane, YG, and 2 Chainz was then released on June 20, 2018. German rapper Ufo361 was also featured on a remix of the song.

== Charts ==
=== Weekly charts ===
Weekly chart performance for "Plug Walk"
Chart (2018)	Peak position
Australia (ARIA)	45
Austria (Ö3 Austria Top 40)	25
Belgium (Ultratip Bubbling Under Flanders)	19
Canada Hot 100 (Billboard)	13
Germany (GfK)	27
Ireland (IRMA)	74
Italy (FIMI)	25
Netherlands (Single Top 100)	96
New Zealand (Recorded Music NZ)	20
Portugal (AFP)	67
Sweden (Sverigetopplistan)	79
Switzerland (Schweizer Hitparade)	36
UK Singles (Official Charts)	53
US Billboard Hot 100	13
US Hot R&B/Hip-Hop Songs (Billboard)	8
US Rhythmic Airplay (Billboard)	14

=== Year-end charts ===
Annual chart performance for "Plug Walk"
Chart (2018)	Position
Canada (Canadian Hot 100)	54
US Billboard Hot 100	57
US Hot R&B/Hip-Hop Songs (Billboard)	33

== Certifications ==
Certifications and sales figures for "Plug Walk"
Region	Certification	Certified units/sales
Australia (ARIA)	Gold	35,000^{‡}
Brazil (Pro-Música Brasil)	2× Platinum	80,000^{‡}
Canada (Music Canada)	2× Platinum	160,000^{‡}
Denmark (IFPI Danmark)	Gold	45,000^{‡}
France (SNEP)	Gold	100,000^{‡}
Germany (BVMI)	Gold	200,000^{‡}
Italy (FIMI)	Gold	25,000^{‡}
New Zealand (RMNZ)	2× Platinum	60,000^{‡}
Poland (ZPAV)	Gold	25,000^{‡}
United Kingdom (BPI)	Gold	400,000^{‡}
United States (RIAA)	3× Platinum	3,000,000^{‡}
^{‡} Sales+streaming figures based on certification alone.

== Release history ==
Release formats for "Plug Walk"
Region	Date	Format	Label
Various	February 9, 2018	Digital download	Interscope
United States	April 10, 2018	Rhythmic contemporary radio	Rich Forever; Interscope
