= The World Is Yours (Rich the Kid album) =

Studio album by Rich the Kid
- Released: March 30, 2018
- Studios: Various: Platinum (New York City, NY); Quad (New York City, NY); The Cutting Room (New York City, NY); Jungle City (New York City, NY); Paramount (Hollywood, CA); 5 Star Productions (Atlanta, GA); Interscope (Santa Monica, CA); Windmark (Santa Monica, CA); No Excuses (Santa Monica, CA); CBE (Santa Monica, CA); The Hit Factory (Miami, FL); Chalice (Hollywood, CA); SremmLife (Los Angeles, CA)
- Genres: Hip-hop; trap
- Length: 49:49
- Labels: Rich Forever; 300; Interscope
- Producers: Rich the Kid (exec.); Ben Jayne; Big White; Cassius Clay; Danny Wolf; Mustard; DJ Official; Doughboy; FrancisGotHeat; Harry Fraud; J. Valle; KC Supreme; Metro Boomin; Mike Free; Lab Cook; LMC; Power; Resource; T-Minus; Taz Taylor; Tony Seltzer; Whatlilshoddysay; Wheezy; WondaGurl

Rich the Kid chronology
Rich Forever 3 (2017)	The World Is Yours (2018)	The World Is Yours 2 (2019)

Singles from The World Is Yours
- 1. "New Freezer" Released: September 26, 2017; 2. "Plug Walk" Released: February 9, 2018; 3. "Dead Friends" Released: March 26, 2018; 4. "Leave Me" Released: July 13, 2018

The World Is Yours is the debut studio album by American rapper Rich the Kid. It was released on March 30, 2018, by Interscope Records and Rich Forever Music. The album features guest appearances from Rich Forever Music labelmate Jay Critch, alongside Chris Brown, Kendrick Lamar, Lil Wayne, Khalid, Rick Ross, Swae Lee of Rae Sremmurd, Trippie Redd, and Quavo and Offset of Migos, among others.

The World Is Yours was supported by four singles: "New Freezer" featuring Kendrick Lamar, "Plug Walk", "Dead Friends" and "Leave Me". The album was met with favorable reviews and received platinum certification by the Recording Industry Association of America (RIAA) on March 9, 2020.

== Background ==
On February 5, 2018, in an interview with XXL, Rich the Kid remarked on the album's expectation, by stating;

"This will be the greatest album of 2018. Best hip-hop album—you heard it here! There's no other rapper that will drop a better album than me. No one."

On February 9, 2018, in an interview with Zane Lowe on Beats 1, Rich the Kid mentioned Chris Brown, Kendrick Lamar, Khalid, Lil Wayne, Jay Critch, Famous Dex as guest features on the album. The album's official release date was revealed on February 21, 2018.

On February 23, 2018, shortly after his appearance at the 2018 Brit Awards with Kendrick Lamar, Rich the Kid revealed his debut album's title. On February 28, 2018, the album's cover art was unveiled via Twitter.

== Artwork ==
The album's artwork features Rich the Kid donning a white suit and a silk button-up, and a slew of chains while holding stacks of cash in hand. He stands in an unknown location surrounded by a forest environment.

The title of the album comes from the film Scarface in Tony Montana's mansion. Along with the name, other elements of the album cover reflect other parts of the film.

== Singles ==
The album's lead single, "New Freezer" featuring Kendrick Lamar was released for streaming and digital download on September 26, 2017, shortly after premiering on Zane Lowe's Beats 1 radio. The Dave Free and Jack Begert-directed music video was released on October 30, 2017.

The album's second single, "Plug Walk" was released on February 9, 2018, following the same roll-out as the former. The Daps-directed music video was released on March 5, 2018.

The album's third single "Dead Friends" was released on March 26, 2018, following the continuous roll-out. The music video was released on April 23, 2018, and it was directed by Rich the Kid himself.

=== Promotional singles ===
The album's lead promotional single, "Early Morning Trappin" featuring Trippie Redd was released on March 15, 2018.

== Controversy ==
On February 27, 2018, Rich the Kid went on Instagram Live to preview a new track called "Dead Friends", which fans and commentators labeled a diss song aimed at Lil Uzi Vert.

== Critical reception ==
Professional ratings
Review scores
Source	Rating
HipHopDX	3.6/5
HotNewHipHop	77%
Pitchfork	6.6/10

Scott Glaysher in a review for HipHopDX gave the album a 3.6/5 and said "The World Is Yours won't have Rich leading the league but it does show his potential and willingness to grow as an artist the new generation of viral hit-driven rappers. If Rich can continue to craft hot singles and wean himself away from leaning on big-name talent, he may actually find rap's globe nestled in his pocket."

== Commercial performance ==
The World Is Yours debuted at number two on the US Billboard 200 with 59,000 album-equivalent units, of which 6,000 were pure album sales. In its second week, the album dropped to number eight on the Billboard 200 and moved another 36,499 album-equivalent units. By December 2018, the album has earned 620,000 album-equivalent units in the United States. On March 9, 2020, the album was certified platinum by Recording Industry Association of America (RIAA) for combined sales and album-equivalent units of over a million units.

== Track listing ==
Credits adapted from the album's liner notes, Tidal, ASCAP, XXL, and Instagram.

No.	Title	Writer(s)	Producer(s)	Length
1.	"World Is Yours"	Dimitri Roger; Clay Hillman	Cassius Clay	2:43
2.	"New Freezer" (featuring Kendrick Lamar)	Roger; Kendrick Duckworth; Ben Jayne; Milton Martin	Jayne	3:11
3.	"No Question" (featuring Future)	Roger; Nayvadius Wilburn; Braylin Bowman	Resource; Mike Free^{[b]}	4:11
4.	"Leave Me"	Roger; Dickinson	Lab Cook; Vou^{[b]}	3:02
5.	"Plug Walk"	Roger; Grant Dickinson	Lab Cook; Taz Taylor^{[b]}; JR Hitmaker^{[b]}	2:55
6.	"Too Gone" (featuring Khalid)	Roger; Khalid Robinson; Ebony Oshunrinde; Francis Nguyen-Tran	WondaGurl; FrancisGotHeat^{[a]}	3:04
7.	"Made It" (featuring Jay Critch and Rick Ross)	Roger; Jason Critchlow; William Roberts II; Rory Quigley; Tony Seltzer; Matt Carrillo	Harry Fraud; Seltzer^{[b]}	3:29
8.	"Drippin" (featuring Chris Brown)	Roger; Christopher Brown; Dickinson; Andrew Gradwohl, Jr.	Lab Cook; Big White^{[b]}	3:21
9.	"Lost It" (featuring Quavo and Offset)	Roger; Quavious Marshall; Kiari Cephus; Leland Wayne	Metro Boomin; Wheezy^{[b]}; Doughboy^{[b]}	4:32
10.	"End of Discussion" (featuring Lil Wayne)	Roger; Dwayne Carter, Jr.; Brandon Mandolf	Kryysun	3:56
11.	"Early Morning Trappin" (featuring Trippie Redd)	Roger; Michael White IV; Tyler Williams; Joshua Valle; Marcus James	T-Minus; J. Valle^{[a]}	3:21
12.	"Small Things"	Roger; Dickinson; Kim Candilora II; Danny Snodgrass	Lab Cook; KC Supreme^{[b]}; Taz Taylor^{[b]}	3:07
13.	"Listen Up"	Roger; Curtidor Flores	Danny Wolf; LMC^{[b]}	2:56
14.	"Gargoyle" (featuring Swae Lee and Offset)	Roger; Khalif Brown; Cephus; Anthony Brown	Whatlilshoddysay	3:10
15.	"Dead Friends"	Roger; Dijon McFarlane	DJ Mustard; DJ Official^{[b]}	2:51
Total length:				49:49

Notes

- ^{^[a]} signifies an additional producer.
- ^{^[b]} signifies an uncredited co-producer.
- "World Is Yours" features uncredited background vocals from Cassius Clay.
- "Leave Me" doesn't appear on the physical version.

== Personnel ==
Credits adapted from the album's liner notes and Tidal.

Technical

- Michael "MikFly" Dottin – mixing (all tracks), recording (tracks 3–5, 7, 10–12, 14)
- Chris Guevara – recording (tracks 1)
- Jeff Ramirez – recording (tracks 2)
- Zeke Mishanec – recording (track 2)
- Eric Manco – recording (track 3)
- Marlon "Mooch" Adams – recording (tracks 6, 8, 10)
- Eddie "eMIX" Hernandez – recording (track 6)
- Patrizio Pigliapoco – recording (track 7)
- Gavin Finn – recording (track 8)
- Dex Randall – recording (track 9)
- Jeff Edwards – recording (track 9)
- Randy Lanphear – recording (track 13)
- Jaycen Joshua – mixing (track 13)

Miscellaneous

- Alex Loucas – photography, art direction
- Travis Brothers – design

== Charts ==
=== Weekly charts ===
Chart (2018)	Peak position
Austrian Albums (Ö3 Austria)	57
Belgian Albums (Ultratop Flanders)	50
Belgian Albums (Ultratop Wallonia)	124
Canadian Albums (Billboard)	3
Czech Albums (ČNS IFPI)	69
Danish Albums (Hitlisten)	20
Dutch Albums (Album Top 100)	18
Finnish Albums (Suomen virallinen lista)	32
German Albums (Offizielle Top 100)	38
Irish Albums (IRMA)	31
Italian Albums (FIMI)	39
New Zealand Albums (RMNZ)	20
Norwegian Albums (VG-lista)	12
Swedish Albums (Sverigetopplistan)	27
Swiss Albums (Schweizer Hitparade)	21
UK Albums (Official Charts)	25
US Billboard 200	2
US Top R&B/Hip-Hop Albums (Billboard)	2

=== Year-end charts ===
Chart (2018)	Position
US Billboard 200	67
US Top R&B/Hip-Hop Albums (Billboard)	37

== Certifications ==
Region	Certification	Certified units/sales
Canada (Music Canada)	Gold	40,000^{‡}
United States (RIAA)	Platinum	1,000,000^{‡}
^{‡} Sales+streaming figures based on certification alone.
