= Rich the Kid =

American rapper (born 1992)

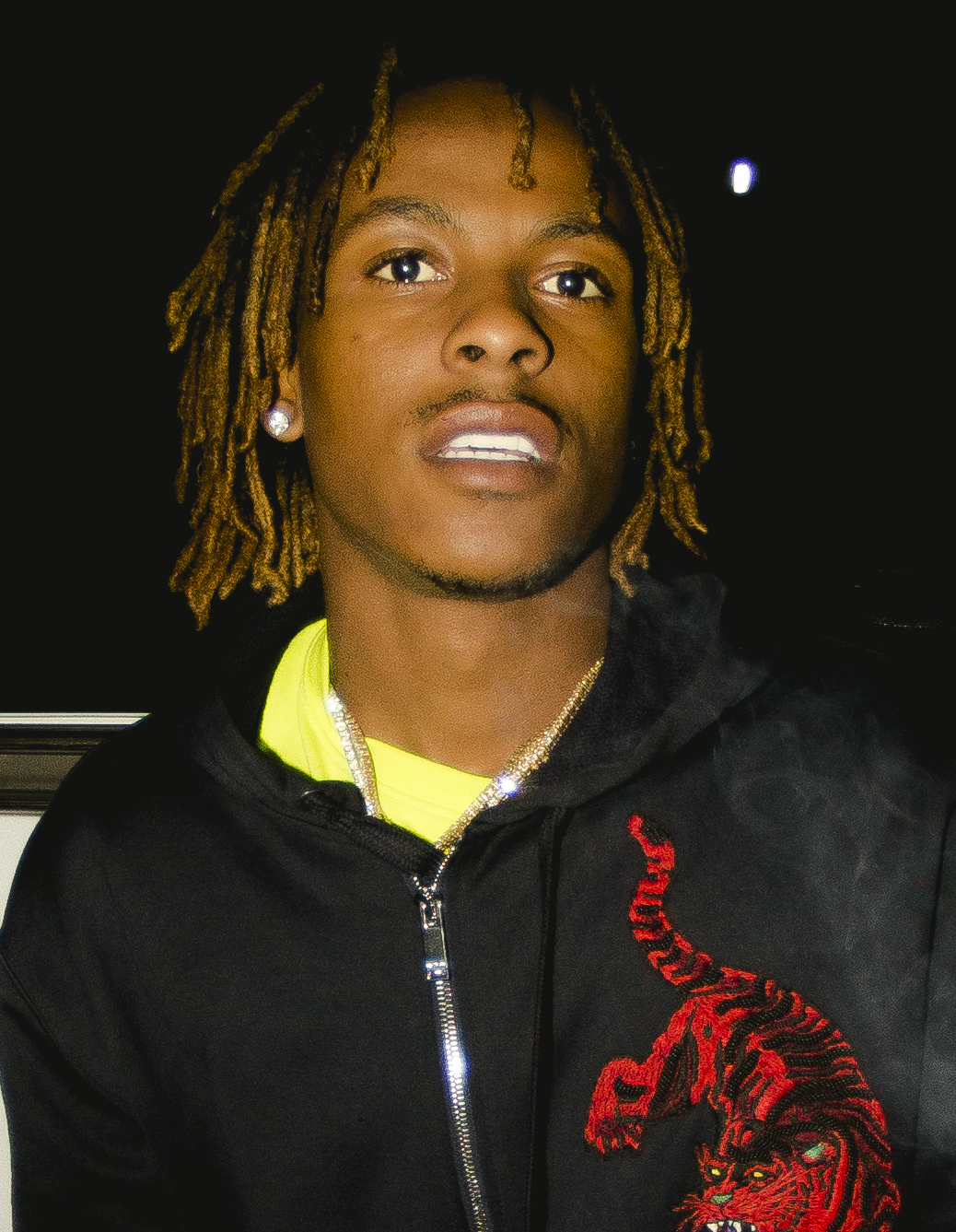
- Rich the Kid in 2019

Background information
- Also known as: Black Boy Da Kid
- Born: Dimitri Leslie Roger; July 13, 1992 (age 34); Queens, New York City, U.S.
- Origin: College Park, Georgia, U.S.
- Genres: Hip hop; trap; SoundCloud rap
- Occupations: Rapper; songwriter
- Works: Rich the Kid discography
- Years active: 2010–present
- Labels: Gamma; Rich Forever; RCA; Rostrum; BMG; EMPIRE; Republic; Interscope; 300; Quality Control; Rimas
- Children: 3
- Website: richforevermusic.com

Dimitri Leslie Roger (born July 13, 1992), known professionally as Rich the Kid, is an American rapper. After a number of independent mixtapes, he signed with Interscope Records in 2017 to release his debut studio album, The World Is Yours (2018). Supported by his best known singles "New Freezer" (featuring Kendrick Lamar) and "Plug Walk", the album peaked at number two on the Billboard 200. His second and third studio albums, The World Is Yours 2 (2019) and Boss Man (2020) peaked at numbers four and 24 on the chart, respectively. He has also released the collaborative mixtapes Nobody Safe (2020) with YoungBoy Never Broke Again, and Trust Fund Babies (2021) with Lil Wayne. Furthermore, he founded the record label Rich Forever Music in 2016, through which he has signed rappers Famous Dex and Jay Critch.

His 2024 single, "Carnival" (with ¥$ featuring Playboi Carti) marked a period of resurgence as it peaked atop the Billboard Hot 100, becoming his first song to do so. Its co-performers, Kanye West and Ty Dolla Sign, both served as executive producers for Roger's fourth studio album, Life's a Gamble (2024), which failed to chart in any known territory.

== Early life ==
Dimitri Leslie Roger was born in Queens, New York City, on July 13, 1992. He is of Haitian descent and grew up speaking Haitian Creole fluently. After his parents' divorce, Roger moved with his mother to College Park, Georgia, when he was 13.

Rich the Kid grew up listening to Nas, Jay-Z, 2Pac, the Notorious B.I.G., and 50 Cent, but after moving to College Park, he began listening to Southern hip hop artists including T.I. and Jeezy. His first rap name was Black Boy Da Kid, but later changed it to Rich the Kid. He attended Elmont Memorial Junior – Senior High School in Elmont, New York.

== Career ==
=== 2013–2016: Career beginnings, Rich Forever, and early mixtapes ===
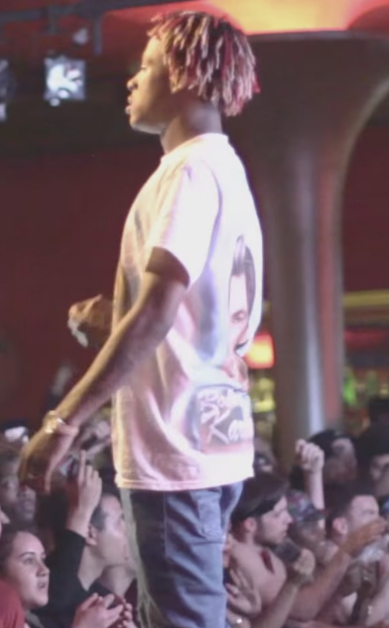
Rich the Kid in May 2016

In 2013, he released his debut solo mixtape, Been About the Benjamins, and later that year released a collaborative mixtape series with Migos called Streets On Lock (volume 1 and 2), with volume 3 being released in 2014 and volume 4 being released in 2015. His second solo mixtape titled Feels Good 2 Be Rich was released in August 2014, and featured artists Migos, Young Thug, Kirko Bangz, Rockie Fresh, Stalley, Soulja Boy, RiFF RaFF, Jeremih, K Camp, Young Dolph, Yo Gotti, French Montana, Chinx & Kodak Black. In November 2014, Rich the Kid released the single "On My Way" featuring GS9 artists, Bobby Shmurda & Rowdy Rebel. In December 2014, he released his third mixtape Rich Than Famous which featured YG, Migos, Bobby Shmurda, Rowdy Rebel, Gucci Mane, Johnny Cinco and PeeWee Longway.

Rich the Kid's first release in 2015 was a collaborative mixtape titled Still On Lock with Migos. In August 2015, he released Flexin' on Purpose. The 14-track project featured collaborations with Master P, Young Dolph, Ty Dolla $ign, Fetty Wap and Rich Homie Quan. In October 2015, he released Streets On Lock 4 with Migos with features from Jose Guapo, Skippa Da Flippa, Hoodrich Pablo Juan, Lil Duke, 2 Chainz, Jeezy, Waka Flocka, Young Dolph, PeeWee Longway, Mango Foo, Slim Jxmmi, iLoveMakonnen, Tray1, Migo Domingo, Migo Jerz, YRN Lingo and Young Greatness.

Rich the Kid and iLoveMakonnen released Whip It, featuring 8 tracks on Thanksgiving Day, November 26, 2015, with guest spots from Rome Fortune, Migos, T-Wayne and Key!. The next month Dabbin Fever was released on Christmas Eve 2015, with features from Wiz Khalifa, Migos, Skippa Da Flippa, 21 Savage, ManMan Savage, Jose Guapo, Playboi Carti, Kodak Black and Curren$y. He released his Trap Talk mixtape in April 2016, which features 21 Savage, Ty Dolla $ign, Playboi Carti, Kodak Black, Migos, Famous Dex and PartyNextDoor.

In March 2016, Rich founded his record label, Rich Forever Music. In October 2016, he released his mixtape Keep Flexin which featured Desiigner, Migos, Famous Dex, Jeremih, Young Thug and Playboi Carti.

=== 2017–2018: Rise to fame, commercial success and The World Is Yours ===
In May 2017, he collaborated as a featured artist on the Diplo song, "Bankroll", which also features Rich Brian and Young Thug (the song originally featured Justin Bieber instead of Rich Brian).

On June 9, 2017, Rich the Kid announced that he had signed to Interscope Records. In an interview with XXL, Roger talked about his decision on signing with Interscope:

I was talking to different labels, Columbia, RCA, Epic, I decided not to sign with Epic even after L.A. Reid offered me a crazy deal. [Senior Vice President of A&R at Interscope] Manny Smith & Interscope CEO John Janick understand me and my vision for myself and also my label. Interscope gave me the opportunity to take over the game completely and that's what I'm going to do.

Rich the Kid released the single "New Freezer" featuring Kendrick Lamar on September 26, 2017. The track marked Rich's first appearance on the Billboard Hot 100, peaking at number 41 on the charts. On February 9, 2018, Rich the Kid released "Plug Walk". The track proceeded to become Rich's highest-charting single at the time on the Hot 100 after peaking at number 13 and received a remix featuring Gucci Mane, YG, and 2 Chainz, released on June 20, 2018. "Dead Friends" was released on March 26, 2018. The three singles apeered on Rich's debut studio album, The World Is Yours with guest appearances from Lil Wayne, Swae Lee, Quavo, Offset, Trippie Redd, Khalid, Kendrick Lamar, Rick Ross, Future, Jay Critch and Chris Brown It debuted at number two on the US Billboard 200, marking his second US top 10 album. In 2018, he also opened for Chris Brown's "Heartbreak on a Full Moon Tour".

=== 2019-2021: The World Is Yours 2, Boss Man, and collaborative mixtapes ===
On January 9, 2019, Rich released the official music video for the December 2018-released, "Splashin". Months later, on March 1, 2019, Rich released the single, "4 Phones" while also announcing his sophomore full-length studio album and the sequel to his debut, The World Is Yours 2. The album's third single, "Tic Toc" with Tory Lanez was released on March 14, 2019, just a week prior to the release of the album. The World Is Yours 2 released with features from Big Sean, YoungBoy Never Broke Again, Lil Pump, Takeoff, Offset, Tory Lanez, Young Thug, Gunna, Miguel, A Boogie wit da Hoodie, Jay Critch, Nav, and Ty Dolla Sign. The album proceeded to debut at number 4 on the Billboard 200 US albums chart.

On December 6, 2019, it was announced that Rich the Kid departed Interscope Records and signed with Republic Records, while still remaining under the UMG umbrella while releasing the lead single to his next album, "That's Tuff" featuring Quavo. The album's second single, "Money Talk" featuring YoungBoy Never Broke Again was released on January 17, 2020. The final two singles, "Red" was released on March 6, 2020, just a week prior to the album's release. On March 13, 2020, Rich released his third full-length studio album, Boss Man, featuring guest appearances from Lil Baby, DaBaby, Nicki Minaj, Post Malone, Lil Tjay, YoungBoy Never Broke Again, London on da Track, and Quavo.

In February 2020, it was announced that Rich would leave Republic and sign a distribution deal with Empire Distribution. On October 16, 2020, Rich teamed up with NBA YoungBoy for the single, "Bankroll". On November 13, the duo released "Automatic", just a week later, on November 20, the duo's collaborative mixtape, Nobody Safe was released.

On April 14, 2021, Rich the Kid signed a multi-million dollar deal with Rostrum Records. This was followed by the release of "Feelin' Like Tunechi" with Lil Wayne on October 1, 2021. The song was then followed by the release of the duo's collaborative mixtape, Trust Fund Babies that same day.

=== 2022–present: Return of Rich Forever and Life's A Gamble ===
On November 14, 2022, Rich the Kid signed with RCA Records and released the single, "Motion".

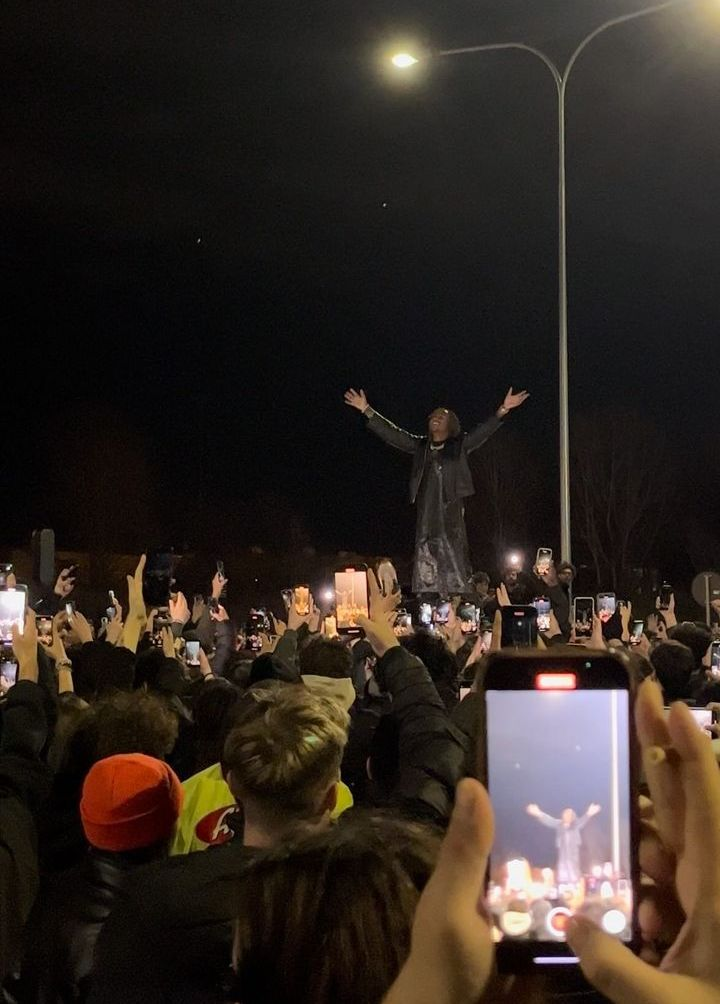
Rich The Kid, standing on the top of his car, right after ¥$’ listening party for their album Vultures 1, in Bologna, Italy (2024)

In mid-2023, he began work on Rich Forever 5, announcing that he, Famous Dex, and Jay Critch have reunited. This was followed by the release of his collaborative single with both rappers, "Big Dawg" in December 2023. The trio then released "Rich & Reckless" in January 2024, while Rich announced the title for his fourth studio album to be Life's A Gamble. On February 10, 2024, Rich the Kid guest performed alongside Playboi Carti on the single "Carnival" by Kanye West and Ty Dolla Sign, from their collaborative album Vultures 1. It peaked atop the Billboard Hot 100, becoming his first song to do so. Capitalizing on its success, on June 22 of that year, he released "Gimme a Second 2", a collaborative single with West featuring Ty Dolla Sign and Peso Pluma. It was released by the record label gamma. and is serving as the lead single for his forthcoming album, Life's a Gamble, which is slated for release in July. In 2026, he starred in the action film Conspiracy of Thieves, directed by Randall Emmett.

== Personal life ==
Roger was married to Antonette Willis and has two children with her. In March 2018, Willis filed for divorce, seeking full physical custody while giving Roger visitation rights and joint legal custody. Willis is also seeking spousal support. This was shortly after Willis accused him of cheating on her with Blac Chyna and India Love, even alleging that he was in a relationship with the former. Willis later claimed that Roger abused her and forced her to have abortions regularly, saying it was commonplace for police to be called to their residence for domestic abuse.

Roger began dating Tori Hughes (professionally known as Tori Brixx) shortly following the filing of the divorce. On June 15, 2018, Roger was hospitalized following a home invasion at Hughes' home. According to a police report, several men entered Hughes' home carrying firearms and demanded money. When Roger attempted to confront them, he was beaten by them and the men left with a "significant" amount of money and jewelry. On December 29, 2018, Rich the Kid got into a UTV accident in Calabasas, CA, when Dimitri and his friend were driving around in a Polaris RZR 4-wheeler. Based on sources from TMZ, it seems that Dimitri lost control of it and fell off of his RZR 4-wheeler and severely injured his hand. He was taken to the hospital shortly after. In February 2019, he was robbed and shot at outside of the Westlake Recording Studio in West Hollywood, California.

== Feuds ==
=== Lil Uzi Vert ===
Rich the Kid and Lil Uzi Vert's feud started on Twitter following a highly publicized label issue Lil Uzi Vert had with DJ Drama's Generation Now imprint in January 2018. Rich the Kid tweeted at Lil Uzi Vert, offering them a position in his imprint Rich Forever Music, in which Uzi replied "Boy I'm not signing for 20 racks". A month later on February 9, 2018, Rich The Kid said that he and Lil Uzi Vert had "personal issues". On February 27, 2018, Rich the Kid previewed a diss track directed at Lil Uzi Vert titled "Dead Friends" with production from DJ Mustard.

On March 26, 2018, Rich the Kid officially released "Dead Friends" as a single. Following the release of "Dead Friends", Rich the Kid said he thought Lil Uzi Vert would not respond. Uzi later responded on their SoundCloud with "Rich Forever Leaked" over the Chief Keef "Where" instrumental, to which Rich the Kid responded by saying "Fuck that nigga." On June 2, 2018, Rich the Kid and Lil Uzi Vert confronted each other at a Starbucks in Philadelphia. The former ran from the latter shortly after. Videos of the altercation were posted online on social media.

== Discography ==
Studio albums

- The World Is Yours (2018)
- The World Is Yours 2 (2019)
- Boss Man (2020)
- Life's a Gamble (2024)

== Rich Forever Music ==
Rich Forever Music
- Founded: 2016
- Founder: Rich the Kid
- Status: Active
- Distributor: Various
- Genre: Hip hop
- Country of origin: United States
- Location: Atlanta, Georgia
- Official website: richforevermusic.com

In March 2016, Rich the Kid started his own record label called Rich Forever Music. The label's first artist signed up was Chicago based Famous Dex. He also signed his first producer to Rich Forever Music, The Lab Cook. In April 2016, Rich the Kid signed his second artist, rapper J $tash.

The record label's first release was a 15-track compilation titled Rich Forever Music, and featured Offset, Skippa Da Flippa, Lil Yachty and OG Maco. Shortly after the release, J $tash parted ways with the label.

In June 2016, Rich the Kid signed a deal to have 300 Entertainment become a parent company for Rich Forever Music.

On July 4, 2016, Rich Forever Music released their second project Rich Forever 2, a collaborative mixtape between Rich the Kid and Famous Dex, with appearances from Wiz Khalifa, Lil Yachty, Young Thug, Jaden Smith and Playboi Carti. In November 2016, Rich the Kid signed Brooklyn rapper Jay Critch to his label.

On March 17, 2017, the label released their third compilation mixtape The Rich Forever Way. The label released their fourth compilation Rich Forever 3 on June 16, 2017.

In March 2017, he signed North Carolina rap trio 83 Babies to his label. He appeared on the remix to their song "No Cap". In October 2017, Lil Tony—one of the group's members—was arrested for murdering a nine-year-old child. In an interview with DJ Vlad, Rich the Kid stated that the group would continue to release music. On July 7, 2022, Lil Tony was sentenced to life in prison.

In February 2018, Rich the Kid signed Texas rapper Almighty Jay to his label. In March 2018, YBN Almighty Jay and Rich the Kid had a fall out when Rich the Kid released a song called Back Quick without YBN Almighty Jay's permission. In April 2018, YBN Almighty Jay did an interview with DJ Akademiks saying he was never signed with the label.

In May 2018, Famous Dex stated he had left Rich Forever Music, and is an independent artist, but shortly after, Rich the Kid stated through the label's Instagram page that he is still signed with the label.
