= 6lack discography =

- Studio albums: 4
- EPs: 1
- Singles: 35

American R&B singer 6lack has released four studio albums, one extended play, and 29 singles. His released his debut studio album, Free 6lack in November 2016, which featured the single "Prblms". In September 2018, 6lack released his second album, East Atlanta Love Letter, which debuted at number three on the Billboard 200 chart. His third album, Since I Have a Lover, was released on March 24, 2023.

== Albums ==
=== Studio albums ===
List of studio albums, with selected chart positions
Title	Album details	Peak chart positions										Certifications
Title	Album details	US	US R&B /HH	US R&B	AUS	BEL (FL)	CAN	IRE	NLD	NZ	UK	Certifications
Free 6lack	Released on: November 18, 2016; Label: LVRN, Interscope; Format: CD, vinyl, digital download, streaming	34	11	6	—	—	75	—	—	—	—	RIAA: Platinum; BPI: Silver; MC: Platinum
East Atlanta Love Letter	Released: September 14, 2018; Label: LVRN, Interscope; Format: CD, vinyl, digital download, streaming	3	2	1	6	21	5	12	7	15	19	RIAA: Gold; BPI: Silver; MC: Platinum
Since I Have a Lover	Released: March 24, 2023; Label: LVRN, Interscope; Format: CD, vinyl, digital download, streaming	24	7	3	—	—	53	—	—	—	—	
Love Is the New Gangsta	Released: May 22, 2026; Label: LVRN, Interscope; Format: CD, vinyl, digital download, streaming	154	49	25	—	—	—	—	—	—	—	
"—" denotes a recording that did not chart or was not released in that territory.

== Extended plays ==
List of extended plays, with selected details and chart positions
Title	Album details	Peak chart positions						
Title	Album details	US	US R&B /HH	US R&B	AUS Urban	BEL (FL)	CAN	UK R&B
6pc Hot EP	Released: June 26, 2020; Label: LVRN, Interscope; Format: Digital download, streaming	15	11	2	25	170	50	37
No More Lonely Nights (Acoustic)	Released: March 22, 2024; Label: LVRN, Interscope; Format: Digital download, streaming	—	—	—	—	—	—	—

== Singles ==
=== As lead artist ===
List of singles as lead artist, with selected chart positions and certifications, showing year released and album name
Title	Year	Peak chart positions									Certifications	Album
Title	Year	US	US R&B /HH	US R&B	AUS	BEL (FL) Tip	CAN	NLD	NZ	UK	Certifications	Album
"Ex Calling"	2016	— (Note: "Ex Calling" did not enter the Billboard Hot 100, but peaked at number 24 on the Bubbling Under Hot 100 chart.)	— (Note: "Ex Calling" did not enter the Billboard Hot R&B/Hip-Hop Songs chart, but peaked at number three on the Bubbling Under R&B/Hip-Hop Singles chart.)	—	—	—	—	—	—	—	RIAA: 2× Platinum; MC: 2× Platinum; RMNZ: Gold	Free 6lack
"Prblms"	2016	72	34	—	—	—	—	—	—	—	RIAA: 4× Platinum; BPI: Silver; MC: 3× Platinum; RMNZ: Platinum	Free 6lack
"Bless Me"	2016	—	—	—	—	—	—	—	—	—		Non-album singles
"Loyal"	2016	—	—	—	—	—	—	—	—	—		Non-album singles
"First Fuck" (with Jhené Aiko)	2017	—	—	—	—	—	—	—	—	—	RIAA: Gold	Non-album singles
"That Far"	2017	—	—	—	—	—	—	—	—	—	ARIA: Gold	Non-album singles
"Grab the Wheel" (with Timbaland)	2017	—	—	—	—	—	—	—	—	—		Non-album singles
"Cutting Ties"	2018	—	—	19	—	—	—	—	— (Note: "Cutting Ties" did not enter the NZ Top 40 Singles Chart, but peaked at number seven on the NZ Heatseeker Singles Chart.)	—	RIAA: Gold	Non-album singles
"OTW" (Note: The song is only included on the vinyl edition of the EP.) (with Khalid and Ty Dolla Sign)	2018	57	35	7	27	18	30	50	11	60	RIAA: 2× Platinum; ARIA: 2× Platinum; BPI: Gold; MC: 2× Platinum; RMNZ: 3× Platinum	Non-album singles
"Switch"	2018	— (Note: "Switch" did not enter the Billboard Hot 100, but peaked at number 13 on the Bubbling Under Hot 100 chart.)	— (Note: "Switch" did not enter the Billboard Hot R&B/Hip-Hop Songs chart, but peaked at number four on the Bubbling Under R&B/Hip-Hop Singles chart.)	13	69	—	99	—	— (Note: "Switch" did not enter the NZ Top 40 Singles Chart, but peaked at number eight on the NZ Heatseeker Singles Chart.)	—	RIAA: Gold; ARIA: Gold; MC: Platinum; RMNZ: Gold	East Atlanta Love Letter
"Nonchalant"	2018	— (Note: "Nonchalant" did not enter the Billboard Hot 100, but peaked at number 18 on the Bubbling Under Hot 100 chart.)	— (Note: "Nonchalant" did not enter the Billboard Hot R&B/Hip-Hop Songs chart, but peaked at number seven on the Bubbling Under R&B/Hip-Hop Singles chart.)	—	—	—	—	—	—	—	RIAA: Gold	East Atlanta Love Letter
"Pretty Little Fears" (featuring J. Cole)	2018	76	35	—	—	—	65	—	— (Note: "Pretty Little Fears" did not enter the NZ Top 40 Singles Chart, but peaked at number 13 on the NZ Hot Singles Chart.)	86	RIAA: 2× Platinum; BPI: Silver; MC: 2× Platinum; RMNZ: Platinum	East Atlanta Love Letter
"Mushroom Chocolate" (with Quin)	2019	—	—	—	—	—	—	—	—	—		Lucid
"It's Not U It's Me" (with Bea Miller)	2019	—	—	—	—	—	—	—	— (Note: "It's Not U It's Me" did not enter the NZ Top 40 Singles Chart, but peaked at number 38 on the NZ Hot Singles Chart.)	—		Non-album single
"Imported" (with Jessie Reyez)	2019	— (Note: "Imported" did not enter the Billboard Hot 100, but peaked at number 24 on the Bubbling Under Hot 100 chart.)	— (Note: "Imported" did not enter the Billboard Hot R&B/Hip-Hop Songs chart, but peaked at number four on the Bubbling Under R&B/Hip-Hop Singles chart.)	14	—	—	—	—	— (Note: "Imported" did not enter the NZ Top 40 Singles Chart, but peaked at number 24 on the NZ Hot Singles Chart.)	—	RIAA: Platinum; ARIA: Gold; MC: Platinum	Before Love Came to Kill Us
"Seasons" (featuring Khalid)	2019	—	—	20	—	—	—	—	— (Note: "Seasons" did not enter the NZ Top 40 Singles Chart, but peaked at number 15 on the NZ Hot Singles Chart.)	—	RIAA: Gold; MC: Gold; RMNZ: Gold	East Atlanta Love Letter
"Touch & Go" (with Tinashe)	2019	—	—	—	—	—	—	—	—	—		Songs for You
"ATL Freestyle"	2020	—	—	—	—	—	—	—	—	—		6pc Hot EP
"Float"	2020	— (Note: "Float" did not enter the Billboard Hot 100, but peaked at number 25 on the Bubbling Under Hot 100 chart.)	—	12	—	—	—	—	—	—		6pc Hot EP
"Know My Rights" (featuring Lil Baby)	2020	75	33	—	—	—	82	—	— (Note: "Know My Rights" did not enter the NZ Top 40 Singles Chart, but peaked at number nine on the NZ Hot Singles Chart.)	—		6pc Hot EP
"Stay Down" (with Lil Durk and Young Thug)	2020	73	26	—	—	—	94	—	—	—	RIAA: Gold	The Voice
"You Ain't Worth It" (with Melii)	2020	—	—	—	—	—	—	—	—	—		Non-album single
"Calling My Phone" (with Lil Tjay)	2021	3	1	—	3	14	1	12	2	2	RIAA: 3× Platinum; ARIA: Platinum; BPI: Platinum; MC: Gold; RMNZ: 2× Platinum	Destined 2 Win
"VIP" (with Luísa Sonza)	2021	—	—	—	—	—	—	—	—	—		Doce 22
"Rent Free" / "By Any Means"	2021	—	—	—	—	—	—	—	—	—		Non-album single (Note: "Rent Free" also appears as the lead single to Since I Have a Lover)
"Lately" (with Eli Derby)	2022	—	—	—	—	—	—	—	—	—		Left on Read
"Forever" (with Jessie Reyez)	2022	—	—	—	—	—	—	—	—	—		Yessie
"Since I Have a Lover"	2023	—	—	—	—	—	—	—	— (Note: "Since I Have a Lover" did not enter the NZ Top 40 Singles Chart, but peaked at number 39 on the NZ Hot Singles Chart.)	—		Since I Have a Lover
"A Letter to My Fans"	2023	—	—	—	—	—	—	—	—	—		Non-album single
"Talkback"	2023	—	—	—	—	—	—	—	— (Note: "Talkback" did not enter the NZ Top 40 Singles Chart, but peaked at number 39 on the NZ Hot Singles Chart.)	—		Since I Have a Lover
"Fatal Attraction"	2023	—	—	—	—	—	—	—	—	—		Since I Have a Lover
"Mustard" (with Jordan Ward)	2023	—	—	—	—	—	—	—	—	—		Moreward (Forward)
"Homicide" / "Mean It" (with Jessie Reyez) (Note: Jessie Reyez only appears on "Mean It")	2023	—	—	—	—	—	—	—	—	—		Non-album single
"Kinks" (with Smile High and the Main Squeeze featuring Quin)	2023	—	—	—	—	—	—	—	—	—		The Vibetape
"Come Alive" (with Strick)	2024	—	—	—	—	—	—	—	—	—		All Time High
"Workin on Me" (with Russ)	2024	—	—	—	—	—	—	—	— (Note: "Workin on Me" did not enter the NZ Top 40 Singles Chart, but peaked at number eight on the NZ Hot Singles Chart.)	—		Non-album singles
"Fuck the Rap Game"	2024	—	—	—	—	—	—	—	—	—		Non-album singles
"Pinacolada"	2024	—	—	—	—	—	—	—	—	—		Non-album singles
"Time's Up" (with Kacy Hill)	2025	—	—	—	—	—	—	—	—	—		Non-album singles
"So Beautiful" (with Johnny Venus)	2025	—	—	—	—	—	—	—	—	—		Shooter
"Hard Truths" (with Umi)	2025	—	—	—	—	—	—	—	—	—		People Stories
"Bird Flu"	2026	—	—	—	—	—	—	—	—	—		Love Is the New Gangsta
"Sunday Again" (with 2 Chainz)	2026	—	—	—	—	—	—	—	—	—		Love Is the New Gangsta
"Ashin' the Blunt" (with Young Thug)	2026	—	—	—	—	—	—	—	— (Note: "Ashin' the Blunt" did not enter the NZ Top 40 Singles Chart, but peaked at number 37 on the NZ Hot Singles Chart.)	—		Love Is the New Gangsta
"—" denotes a recording that did not chart or was not released in that territory.

=== As featured artist ===
List of singles as featured artist, with selected chart positions, showing year released and album name
Title	Year	Peak chart positions		Album
Title	Year	US R&B	NZ Hot	Album
"Spar" (Dreezy featuring 6lack and Kodak Black)	2017	—	—	Non-album singles
"If You Ever" (Nao featuring 6lack)	2018	—	—	Non-album singles
"Waves" (Normani featuring 6lack)	2018	19	36	Non-album singles
"Only Want You" (Rita Ora featuring 6lack)	2019	—	—	Phoenix
"U Say" (The Bonfyre featuring 6lack)	2019	—	—	Love, Lust & Let Downs: Chapter One
"Prada Process" (Guapdad 4000 featuring 6lack)	2019	—	—	Dior Deposits
"Easy" (Next Town Down featuring 6lack)	2019	—	—	Juliet
"How TF" (Deante' Hitchcock featuring 6lack)	2019	—	—	Better
"Let It Rain" (Baby Tate featuring 6lack)	2020	—	—	After the Rain
"Love Songs (Remix)" (Kaash Paige featuring 6lack)	2020	—	—	Non-album single
"Morocco" (Alina Baraz featuring 6lack)	2020	—	—	It Was Divine
"The Pink Phantom" (Gorillaz featuring Elton John and 6lack)	2020	—	—	Song Machine, Season One: Strange Timez
"Sere (Remix)" (Spinall featuring 6lack and Fireboy DML)	2021	—	—	Top Boy
"That's How It Goes" (Zoe Wees featuring 6lack)	2021	—	—	Therapy
"On Guard" (Lauren Jauregui featuring 6lack)	2021	—	—	Prelude
"Midnight River" (Pink Sweat$ featuring 6lack)	2021	—	—	Pink Moon
"Miss My Dawgs" (Kaash Paige featuring 6lack)	2022	—	—	S2ML
"Tell Me It's Over" (Jacquees featuring Summer Walker and 6lack)	2022	—	—	Sincerely for You
"Out of My Body" (DC the Don featuring 6lack)	2023	—	—	Funeral
"—" denotes a recording that did not chart

== Other charted and certified songs ==
Title	Year	Peak chart positions					Certifications	Album
Title	Year	US	US R&B/ HH	US R&B	CAN	NZ Hot	Certifications	Album
"Never Know"	2016	—	—	—	—	—	RIAA: Gold	Free 6lack
"Free"	2016	—	—	—	—	—	RIAA: Platinum	Free 6lack
"Luving U"	2016	—	—	—	—	—	RIAA: Gold	Free 6lack
"One Way" (featuring T-Pain)	2017	—	—	—	—	—	RIAA: Gold	Free 6lack
"Unfair"	2018	— (Note: "Unfair" did not enter the Billboard Hot 100, but peaked at number 21 on the Bubbling Under Hot 100 chart.)	— (Note: "Unfair" did not enter the Billboard Hot R&B/Hip-Hop Songs chart, but peaked at number 10 on the Bubbling Under R&B/Hip-Hop Singles chart.)	16	—	—		East Atlanta Love Letter
"Loaded Gun"	2018	— (Note: "Loaded Gun" did not enter the Billboard Hot 100, but peaked at number 16 on the Bubbling Under Hot 100 chart.)	— (Note: "Loaded Gun" did not enter the Billboard Hot R&B/Hip-Hop Songs chart, but peaked at number five on the Bubbling Under R&B/Hip-Hop Singles chart.)	15	—	—		East Atlanta Love Letter
"East Atlanta Love Letter" (featuring Future)	2018	— (Note: "East Atlanta Love Letter" did not enter the Billboard Hot 100, but peaked at number seven on the Bubbling Under Hot 100 chart.)	— (Note: "East Atlanta Love Letter" did not enter the Billboard Hot R&B/Hip-Hop Songs chart, but peaked at number two on the Bubbling Under R&B/Hip-Hop Singles chart.)	11	—	24	RIAA: Gold	East Atlanta Love Letter
"Let Her Go"	2018	— (Note: "Let Her Go" did not enter the Billboard Hot 100, but peaked at number 23 on the Bubbling Under Hot 100 chart.)	—	19	—	—		East Atlanta Love Letter
"Sorry"	2018	—	—	21	—	—		East Atlanta Love Letter
"Balenciaga Challenge" (featuring Offset)	2018	— (Note: "Balenciaga Challenge" did not enter the Billboard Hot 100, but peaked at number 19 on the Bubbling Under Hot 100 chart.)	— (Note: "Balenciaga Challenge" did not enter the Billboard Hot R&B/Hip-Hop Songs chart, but peaked at number eight on the Bubbling Under R&B/Hip-Hop Singles chart.)	—	—	23		East Atlanta Love Letter
"Crowded Room" (Selena Gomez featuring 6lack)	2020	— (Note: "Crowded Room" did not enter the Billboard Hot 100, but peaked at number 20 on the Bubbling Under Hot 100 chart.)	—	—	92	—		Rare
"Long Nights"	2020	—	—	13	—	37		6PC Hot EP
"Elephant in the Room"	2020	—	—	20	—	—		6PC Hot EP
"Outside"	2020	—	—	25	—	—		6PC Hot EP
"Let Go My Hand" (with J. Cole and Bas)	2021	19	13	—	23	—	RIAA: Gold	The Off-Season
"Retrograde" (Khalid featuring 6lack and Lucky Daye)	2021	—	—	—	—	— (Note: "Retrograde" did not enter the NZ Top 40 Singles Chart, but peaked at number 39 on the NZ Hot Singles Chart.)		Scenic Drive
"—" denotes a recording that did not chart.

== Guest appearances ==
List of non-single guest appearances, with other performing artists, showing year released and album name
Title	Year	Other artist(s)	Album
"LeTrow"	2015	JID	DiCaprio
"Spaced"	2015	EarthGang	Bears Like This Too
"Pussy On Repeat"	2015	EarthGang, JID	Bears Like This Too
"Sky"	2015	JID	Bears Like This Too
"Love Child"	2015	EarthGang, JID, JordxnBryant, Mereba	Bears Like This Too
"Shaolin's Theme / Pray"	2016	Malay	The Get Down
"Over"	2017	Syd	Fin
"8701"	2017	JID	The Never Story
"Drown the Lovers" (Remix)	2017	Ritual	No Escape Out of Time
"Belong to You" (Remix)	2017	Sabrina Claudio	About Time
"I Like You"	2017	Childish Major, DRAM	Woo$ah
"Climax"	2018	Young Thug	On the Rvn
"Stuck in My Ways"	2018	Phora	Love is Hell
"Zone 6" (Remix)	2018	Young Nudy, Future	Slimeball 3
"Tiiied"	2018	JID, Ella Mai	DiCaprio 2
"Love on Ice"	2018	Key! & Kenny Beats	777 Deluxe
"More/Diamond Ring"	2018	Benny Blanco, Ty Dolla Sign	Friends Keep Secrets
"Skydive II"	2019	Boogie	Everythings for Sale
"RPG"	2019	Kehlani	While We Wait
"Heatwave"	2019	Mereba	The Jungle is the Only Way Out
"Drunk"	2019	Schoolboy Q	Crash Talk
"Like It"	2019	Summer Walker	Over It
"Expectations"	2019	Wale	Wow... That's Crazy
"Sweet Insomnia"	2019	Gallant	Sweet Insomnia
"I Want You Around" (Remix)	2019	Snoh Aalegra	Ugh, those feels again
"Yo Love"	2019	Vince Staples, Mereba	Queen & Slim: The Soundtrack
"Crowded Room"	2020	Selena Gomez	Rare
"Black Men Don't Cheat"	2020	K Camp, Ari Lennox, Tink	Kiss Five
"Still Dreamin"	2020	JID, Lute	Revenge of the Dreamers III: Director's Cut
"Your Turn"	2020	Ty Dolla Sign, Musiq Soulchild, Tish Hyman	Featuring Ty Dolla Sign
"Let Go My Hand"	2021	J. Cole, Bas	The Off-Season
"Score"	2021	Isaiah Rashad, SZA	The House Is Burning
"Spend a Bag"	2021	Tion Wayne	Green With Envy
"Retrograde"	2021	Khalid, Lucky Daye	Scenic Drive
"Hold Me"	2022	Rema	Rave & Roses
"Ain't No Way"	2022	Denzel Curry, Rico Nasty, JID, Jasiah, Kitty Cash	Melt My Eyez See Your Future
"Log Out"	2022	T-Shyne, YSL Records, Swae Lee	Confetti Nights
"Nothing More to Say"	2022	Calvin Harris, Donae'o	Funk Wav Bounces Vol. 2
"Nrich"	2023	Killer Mike	Michael
"Disguise" (Remix)	2024	Amaarae	Roses are Red, Tears are Blue — A Fountain Baby Extended Play
"Wholeheartedly"	2025	JID, Ty Dolla Sign	God Does Like Ugly
"Lose That Light"	2026	Loreen	Wildfire
