= London Cyr =

Canadian record producer (born 1997 or 1998)

- Born: James Austin Cyr; 1997 or 1998; Vancouver, British Columbia, Canada
- Origin: Toronto, Ontario, Canada
- Genres: Hip hop; trap; R&B
- Occupations: Record producer; songwriter; audio engineer; DJ
- Years active: 2017–present
- Label: Wonderchild (2021)

James Austin Cyr (born 1997 or 1998), known professionally as London Cyr, is a Canadian record producer, songwriter and audio engineer. He first gained recognition for co-producing "Can't Say" from Travis Scott's 2018 album Astroworld, a song that has been certified triple platinum by the Recording Industry Association of America (RIAA) and that earned Cyr a nomination certificate when the album was nominated for Best Rap Album at the 61st Annual Grammy Awards.

In 2021, Cyr signed to Wonderchild, the label founded by fellow Canadian producer WondaGurl as a joint venture with Sony Music Publishing and Travis Scott's Cactus Jack publishing arm. He has since produced records for artists including Don Toliver, Young Thug, 6lack, Lil Baby, SoFaygo, Nav and Doja Cat. Beginning in 2024, Cyr became a frequent collaborator of Drake, contributing to the EP 100 Gigs (2024), the album Some Sexy Songs 4 U (2025), the single "What Did I Miss?" (2025) and seven tracks on Drake's ninth studio album Iceman (2026). In July 2026, he signed a publishing deal with Electric Feel Publishing in partnership with Sony Music Publishing.

== Early life ==
Cyr was born in Vancouver, British Columbia, and has described himself as originally being from Vancouver Island, where he has said access to the music industry felt limited. He was raised in Toronto, Ontario, where he began making beats at age 13 as a hobby and met the rapper Killy, one of his earliest collaborators, while the two attended middle school together. After graduating from high school in 2015, Cyr decided to pursue music as a career and moved to England to study sound engineering at a post-secondary institution.

== Career ==
=== 2017–2020: Beginnings ===
After returning to Toronto from England, Cyr worked as an audio engineer and DJ within the city's rap scene, becoming closely associated with Killy. He mastered Killy's debut project Surrender Your Soul (2018) and served as his tour DJ, including at Killy's sold-out hometown show at the Phoenix Concert Theatre in March 2018. During this period Cyr met WondaGurl at the home of Toronto producer Daxz, and the two became friends through studio sessions with Killy before beginning to make beats together roughly six months later.

Cyr's first major placement came in August 2018, when "Can't Say", a song he co-produced with WondaGurl and which features uncredited vocals from Don Toliver, appeared on Travis Scott's Astroworld. Cyr created the original loop in Toronto, and WondaGurl built the beat before travelling to Hawaii to work with Scott; Cyr has said he did not know the song would appear on the album until Astroworld was released. The song has been certified 3× platinum by the RIAA, and Astroworld's nomination for Best Rap Album at the 61st Annual Grammy Awards in 2019 earned Cyr, as a credited contributor, a Grammy nomination certificate. That same year, Cyr co-produced "Chupacabra" with WondaGurl for Killy's EP Killstreak and produced "LLSD" for Toronto rapper Smoke Dawg.

In December 2019, Cyr co-produced "What to Do?", featuring Don Toliver, with fellow Wonderchild signee Jenius for JackBoys, the compilation album by Travis Scott's Cactus Jack label. Other credits from this period include Shy Glizzy's "Waikiki Flow" and French artist Luidji's "Nuage". In 2020, Cyr co-produced "Know My Rights", featuring Lil Baby, for 6lack's 6pc Hot EP alongside producer Fwdslxsh, whom he had met at engineer Mike Hector's Toronto studio.

=== 2021–2023: Wonderchild signing ===
During the COVID-19 pandemic, Cyr returned to Canada for nine months and collaborated remotely with artists and producers before relocating to Los Angeles in January 2021. In June 2021, WondaGurl announced that she had signed Cyr to her label Wonderchild, a joint venture with Sony Music Publishing and Cactus Jack Publishing, saying his "talent speaks for itself" and that "he puts in the hours that it takes to be a great producer".

In 2021, Cyr co-produced "No Surprise", by Young Thug featuring Don Toliver and BSlime, for the deluxe edition of the Young Stoner Life compilation Slime Language 2; he created the beat with Alex Lustig and Fwdslxsh, with additional production from Wheezy. Later that year he co-produced "Outerspace", featuring Baby Keem, on Don Toliver's album Life of a Don alongside Jahaan Sweet, Mike Dean and Dez Wright.

In 2022, Cyr produced four tracks on SoFaygo's debut studio album Pink Heartz: "Out", "Me Too", "Goin Back" and "Another One". He also produced "Loaded" for the bonus edition of Nav's Demons Protected by Angels. In 2023, his credits included "Spirited Away", co-produced with Fwdslxsh and Apob, on 6lack's album Since I Have a Lover, as well as "Fam Without Blood", a single by Montreal artist Skiifall produced alongside WondaGurl and others, which appeared on Woiiyoie Vol. 2 – Intense City.

=== 2024–present: Drake collaborations and Iceman ===
In April 2024, Cyr co-produced "Disrespectful", featuring the Joy, on Doja Cat's deluxe album Scarlet 2 Claude. That August, he began working with Drake, co-producing three songs on the EP 100 Gigs: "It's Up", featuring 21 Savage and Young Thug, which debuted and peaked at number 28 on the US Billboard Hot 100; "Circadian Rhythm", which entered the chart at number 69; and "No Face", which entered at number 60. Cyr had named Drake as a dream collaborator in his 2021 Complex interview, calling him "the cliché Canadian producer one".

In February 2025, Cyr co-produced and played keyboards on "Something About You" from Some Sexy Songs 4 U, Drake's collaborative album with PartyNextDoor; the song debuted at number 26 on the Hot 100 and was later certified gold by the RIAA. On July 5, 2025, Drake released "What Did I Miss?", the lead single from Iceman, with production credited to Cyr, O Lil Angel, DJ Lewis, FNZ, Elyas, Gyz, Tay Keith, OZ and Patron. The song debuted at number two on the Hot 100, blocked by Alex Warren's "Ordinary", and opened at number one on the Hot R&B/Hip-Hop Songs and Hot Rap Songs charts, becoming Drake's record-extending 31st leader on the former. It later topped the Rhythmic Airplay chart as Drake's 42nd number one on that listing.

Iceman was released on May 15, 2026, alongside the surprise albums Habibti and Maid of Honour; the three projects debuted at numbers one, two and three on the Billboard 200, making Drake the first artist to hold the chart's top three positions simultaneously. Cyr produced seven tracks on Iceman: "Whisper My Name", "National Treasures", "Plot Twist", "B's on the Table", "Burning Bridges", "What Did I Miss?" and "Little Birdie", as well as "Gen 5" on Habibti. In the album's opening week, "Whisper My Name" debuted at number three on the Hot 100, "National Treasures" at number six, "Plot Twist" at number 11, "B's on the Table" at number 12, "Burning Bridges" at number 13 and "Little Birdie" at number 18. Following the release, Cyr wrote on Instagram that Drake had "changed my life".

In July 2026, Cyr signed a publishing deal with Electric Feel Publishing, founded by Austin Rosen, in partnership with Sony Music Publishing. Announcing the deal, Sony Music Publishing vice president of creative Ari Gelaw called Cyr "a true visionary, whose influence on hip-hop culture is undeniable".

== Artistry ==
Cyr's production has been described as psychedelic, a characterization he has qualified by calling his sound "a unique blend of, like, happy and sad, moody sounds", noting that "the psychedelic sound isn't necessarily, like, happy, or sad. It can be either." Cyr has cited Travis Scott as an early inspiration, and has named MF Doom, Madlib, Kendrick Lamar, Black Star, Freddie Gibbs, Jay Electronica, Baby Keem and the duo Brevin Kim among his listening influences. He has named Frank Ocean and Drake as dream collaborators.

== Production discography ==
Selected production credits
Year	Artist	Album	Song(s)	Ref.
2018	Travis Scott	Astroworld	"Can't Say" (featuring Don Toliver)	
2018	Killy	Killstreak	"Chupacabra"	
2018	Smoke Dawg	Non-album single	"LLSD"	
2019	JackBoys and Travis Scott	JackBoys	"What to Do?" (featuring Don Toliver)	
2019	Shy Glizzy	Aloha	"Waikiki Flow"	
2019	Luidji	Toronto / Paris	"Nuage"	
2020	6lack	6pc Hot	"Know My Rights" (featuring Lil Baby)	
2021	Young Stoner Life and Young Thug	Slime Language 2 (deluxe)	"No Surprise" (featuring Don Toliver and BSlime)	
2021	Don Toliver	Life of a Don	"Outerspace" (featuring Baby Keem)	
2021	Anders	Chaos	"Don't Play"	
2022	Nav	Demons Protected by Angels (bonus version)	"Loaded"	
2022	SoFaygo	Pink Heartz	"Out", "Me Too", "Goin Back", "Another One"	
2023	6lack	Since I Have a Lover	"Spirited Away"	
2023	Skiifall	Woiiyoie Vol. 2 – Intense City	"Fam Without Blood"	
2024	Doja Cat	Scarlet 2 Claude	"Disrespectful" (featuring the Joy)	
2024	Drake	100 Gigs	"It's Up" (featuring 21 Savage and Young Thug), "Circadian Rhythm", "No Face"	
2025	PartyNextDoor and Drake	Some Sexy Songs 4 U	"Something About You"	
2026	Drake	Iceman	"Whisper My Name", "National Treasures", "Plot Twist", "B's on the Table" (featuring 21 Savage), "Burning Bridges", "What Did I Miss?", "Little Birdie"	
2026	Drake	Habibti	"Gen 5"	

== Awards and nominations ==
Year	Organization	Award	Work	Result	Ref.
2019	Grammy Awards	Best Rap Album	Astroworld (as contributing producer and songwriter)	Nominated	
