= Cutting Ties =

Cutting Ties may refer to:

- Cutting Ties (story), from the anthology Star Trek Mirror Universe: Obsidian Alliances
- "Cutting Ties" (6lack song), a 2017 song by 6lack
- "Cutting Ties", a song on the 2014 soundtrack album Days of Future Past
- "Cutting Ties", a 2022 TV episode of Zatima

== See also ==
- "Cut Ties", episode from the American television series Justified
