= Headshot (Lil Tjay, Polo G and Fivio Foreign song) =

Single by Lil Tjay, Polo G, and Fivio Foreign

from the album Destined 2 Win
- Released: March 19, 2021
- Genre: Trap
- Length: 2:24
- Label: Columbia; Sony
- Songwriters: Tione Merritt; Taurus Bartlett; Maxie Ryles III; Thomas Horton; Tahj Vaughn; David McDowell; Brendan Walsh; Luis Campozano
- Producers: TNTXD; Tahj Money; Dmac; Bordeaux; Non Native

Lil Tjay singles chronology
| "Calling My Phone" (2021) | "Headshot" (2021) | "Born 2 Be Great" (2021) |

Polo G singles chronology
| "Patience" (2021) | "Headshot" (2021) | "For My Fans (Freestyle)" (2021) |

Fivio Foreign singles chronology
| "Thirty 30" (2021) | "Headshot" (2021) | "Body (Remix)" (2021) |

Music video
- "Headshot" on YouTube

"Headshot" is a song by American rappers Lil Tjay, Polo G, and Fivio Foreign. It was released through Columbia and Sony as the fifth single from the former's second studio album, Destined 2 Win, on March 19, 2021. The artists wrote the song alongside producers TNTXD, Tahj Money, Dmac, 101Slide, Bordeaux, and Non Native.

== Background and composition ==
The trap-infused "sinister song" shows the three artists warning others that "any attempt to attack them will not only fail but be met with swift retaliation".

It serves as the first collaboration between all three rappers on the same song together. However, the three drill artists have collaborated with each other individually. "Headshot" serves as the third collaboration between Lil Tjay and Polo G, following Polo's 2019 single "Pop Out" and their joint single "First Place", which was released in 2020. It goes on to mark Tjay and Fivio's fourth collaboration that follows three collaborations in 2020: their joint track "Ambition" and Tjay's two back-to-back tracks "Zoo York" and "Shoot for the Stars", the former of which also features late American rapper Pop Smoke. The song is the second collaboration from Polo G and Fivio Foreign, following their joint 2020 single "Bop It".

== Release and promotion ==
All three artists announced the song and its complete details (cover art and release date) on their respective social media accounts on March 15, 2021.

== Music video ==
After a few days of teasing, the official music video for the song premiered on Lil Tjay's YouTube channel on March 22, 2021. The three artists repeatedly shoot apples off a man's head with guns, somehow killing him at the end, and also race remote-control boats. It takes place in a courtyard outside a mansion. At the end of the Video, Lil Tjay is seen feeding a giraffe, while the then-unreleased song "Run It Up" from Destined 2 Win is played.

== Credits and personnel ==
Credits adapted from Tidal.

- Lil Tjay – vocals, songwriting
- Polo G – vocals, songwriting
- Fivio Foreign – vocals, songwriting
- TNTXD – production, songwriting
- Tahj Money – production, songwriting
- Dmac – production, songwriting
- Bordeaux – production, songwriting, mixing, mastering, recording
- Non Native – production, songwriting
- Drü Oliver – recording

== Charts ==
Chart performance for "Headshot"
| Chart (2021) | Peak position |
|---|---|
| Australia (ARIA) | 70 |
| Canada Hot 100 (Billboard) | 16 |
| Ireland (IRMA) | 39 |
| Netherlands (Single Top 100) | 88 |
| New Zealand Hot Singles (RMNZ) | 7 |
| Portugal (AFP) | 191 |
| Sweden Heatseeker (Sverigetopplistan) | 5 |
| UK Singles (Official Charts) | 40 |
| US Billboard Hot 100 | 42 |
| US Hot R&B/Hip-Hop Songs (Billboard) | 21 |
| US Rhythmic Airplay (Billboard) | 33 |

== Certifications ==
Certifications for "Headshot"
| Region | Certification | Certified units/sales |
|---|---|---|
| Canada (Music Canada) | 2× Platinum | 160,000^{‡} |
| Denmark (IFPI Danmark) | Gold | 45,000^{‡} |
| New Zealand (RMNZ) | Gold | 15,000^{‡} |
| United Kingdom (BPI) | Silver | 200,000^{‡} |
| United States (RIAA) | 2× Platinum | 2,000,000^{‡} |
^{‡} Sales+streaming figures based on certification alone.

== Release history ==
Release history for "Headshot"
| Country | Date | Format | Label | Ref. |
|---|---|---|---|---|
| Various | March 19, 2021 | Digital download; streaming | Columbia; Sony | |
| United States | June 22, 2021 | Rhythmic contemporary radio | Columbia | |
