= None of Your Love =

Single by Lil Tjay

Single by Lil Tjay

from the album Destined 2 Win
- Released: December 4, 2020
- Length: 2:33
- Label: Columbia
- Songwriters: Tione Merritt; Alex Petit; Justin Bieber; Christopher Bridges; Christopher Stewart; Terius Nash; Christina Flores
- Producer: CashMoneyAP

Lil Tjay singles chronology
| "Move On" (2020) | "None of Your Love" (2020) | "Calling My Phone" (2021) |

"None of Your Love" is a song by American rapper Lil Tjay. It was first released on July 29, 2018 before being released to streaming services on December 4, 2020, as the third single and a bonus track from his second studio album Destined 2 Win (2021). Produced by CashMoneyAP, the song samples and interpolates "Baby" by Justin Bieber featuring Ludacris.

== Background ==
Lil Tjay originally uploaded the song on YouTube in July 2018, but it was removed due to sample clearance issues. He later teased the song in 2019. In 2020, he announced the sample was cleared and officially released the song on streaming services.

== Composition ==
A pop-leaning song, "None of Your Love" finds Lil Tjay reflecting on a girl who initially refused him and only wanted his love after he became famous, as well as his related heartbreak, moving on, his time spent in jail and newfound fame. He performs through a layer of Auto-Tune and interpolates the second verse of "Baby" in the pre-chorus,

== Critical reception ==
Pitchfork wrote of the song, "The A Boogie influence is strong, but there's an energy about him, and a youthful pettiness that already makes Tjay feel more of a complete artist with a three-dimensional personality." Farah Idrees of Earmilk remarked, "Tjay's melodic genius bodies the track. The hook is a melodic emulation of Justin Bieber's 'Baby' (unexpected yet brilliant)."

== Charts ==
Chart performance for "None of Your Love"
| Chart (2020) | Peak position |
|---|---|
| New Zealand Hot Singles (RMNZ) | 29 |

== Certifications ==
Certifications for "None of Your Love"
| Region | Certification | Certified units/sales |
|---|---|---|
| Canada (Music Canada) | Gold | 40,000^{‡} |
^{‡} Sales+streaming figures based on certification alone.
