= Losses (song) =

Single by Lil Tjay

Single by Lil Tjay

from the album Destined 2 Win
- Released: October 30, 2020
- Length: 3:15
- Label: Columbia; Sony
- Songwriters: Tione Merritt; Levi De Jong
- Producer: Woodpecker

Lil Tjay singles chronology
"It Is What It Is (Remix)" (2020)	"Losses" (2020)	"Move On" (2020)

Music video
- "Losses" on YouTube

"Losses" is a song by American Lil Tjay, released on October 30, 2020. It is the lead single and a bonus track from his second studio album Destined 2 Win (2020). The song was produced by Woodpecker. An accompanying music video of the song was directed by Shomi Patwary.

== Composition and lyrics ==
In the song, Lil Tjay reflects his struggles in his past life and what he has learned from them, and promises to improve himself and not let them control his future ("Can't change, I remember what I been through / So when I spit no need for pencils / Traumatized, shit be fucking with my mental / I seen some shit I can't get into / I'm just tryna be somebody influential / A lot of souls I could vent to / My success is not something coincidental").

== Charts ==
Chart performance for "Losses"
Chart (2020)	Peak position
Canada Hot 100 (Billboard)	74
New Zealand Hot Singles (RMNZ)	20
UK Singles (OCC)	84
US Bubbling Under Hot 100 (Billboard)	6
US Hot R&B/Hip-Hop Songs (Billboard)	45

== Certifications ==
Certifications for "Losses"
Region	Certification	Certified units/sales
Canada (Music Canada)	Gold	40,000^{‡}
^{‡} Sales+streaming figures based on certification alone.
