= It's Up =

2024 song by Drake featuring 21 Savage and Young Thug

Song by Drake featuring 21 Savage and Young Thug

from the EP 100 Gigs
- Released: August 10, 2024
- Genre: Hip hop
- Length: 4:38
- Label: OVO; Republic
- Songwriters: Aubrey Graham; Shéyaa Abraham-Joseph; Jeffery Williams; Benjamin Wilson; Elias Sticken; Gyz; James Cyr; Thomas Levesque
- Producers: Ben10k; Elyas; Gyz; London Cyr; Tom Levesque

"It's Up" is a song by Canadian rapper Drake. It was released on August 10, 2024, from his fifth EP 100 Gigs (2024). It features rappers 21 Savage and Young Thug. The song was produced by Ben10k, Elyas, Gyz, London Cyr and Tom Levesque.

== Content ==
On the song, 21 Savage directs criticism at an unknown person in his lyrics "Made a couple songs think he hot now / Hit his ass up think he 'Pac now". Many speculated he was targeting rapper Kendrick Lamar, whom Drake has been feuding with, but Savage's manager Justin "Meezy" Williams denied this interpretation. DJ Akademiks announced the information on his Rumble livestream, reading a text message from Meezy. In addition, the track concludes with Drake delivering lines interpreted as a diss toward rapper ASAP Rocky, referencing his fashion sense, ASAP Mob collective and album Long. Live. ASAP: "Knockin' off the namebrand niggas in your crew/Heard you miss your dogs, now it's long live who? Idiot".

== Critical reception ==
Jeff Ihaza of Rolling Stone described the song as "gritty, hardnosed raps", adding that as with other tracks on 100 Gigs, it "offers an example of something Drake does well."

== Charts ==
=== Weekly charts ===
Weekly chart performance for "It's Up"
| Chart (2024) | Peak position |
|---|---|
| Canada Hot 100 (Billboard) | 24 |
| Global 200 (Billboard) | 47 |
| Ireland (IRMA) | 94 |
| New Zealand Hot Singles (RMNZ) | 3 |
| UK Singles (Official Charts) | 82 |
| UK Hip Hop/R&B (Official Charts) | 22 |
| US Billboard Hot 100 | 28 |
| US Hot R&B/Hip-Hop Songs (Billboard) | 8 |

=== Year-end charts ===
2024 year-end chart performance for "It's Up"
| Chart (2024) | Position |
|---|---|
| US Hot R&B/Hip-Hop Songs (Billboard) | 95 |
