= Move On (Lil Tjay song) =

Single by Lil Tjay

Single by Lil Tjay

from the album Destined 2 Win
- Released: November 20, 2020
- Length: 2:57
- Label: Columbia; Sony
- Songwriters: Tione Merritt; Avery Cockerill
- Producers: Avery on the Beat; Minor2Go

Lil Tjay singles chronology
"Losses" (2020)	"Move On" (2020)	"None of Your Love" (2020)

Music video
- "Move On" on YouTube

"Move On" is a song by American rapper Lil Tjay, released on November 20, 2020 with an accompanying music video. It is the second single and a bonus track from his second studio album Destined 2 Win (2020). The song was produced by Avery on the Beat.

== Composition ==
Described as "slow and melodic", the song finds Lil Tjay singing about moving on from a toxic relationship with a woman and what she would lose if they break up. He desires to continue the relationship, but is ready to end it.

== Music video ==
The music video, released alongside the single, features Lil Tjay working in a movie theater and also as an actor in an "old-timey film".

== Charts ==
Chart performance for "Move On"
Chart (2020)	Peak position
Canada Hot 100 (Billboard)	77
New Zealand Hot Singles (RMNZ)	19
UK Singles (OCC)	65
US Bubbling Under Hot 100 (Billboard)	25
US Hot R&B/Hip-Hop Songs (Billboard)	45

== Certifications ==
Certifications for "Move On"
Region	Certification	Certified units/sales
Canada (Music Canada)	Gold	40,000^{‡}
United States (RIAA)	Gold	500,000^{‡}
^{‡} Sales+streaming figures based on certification alone.
