= Love Is the New Gangsta =

Studio album by 6lack
- Released: May 22, 2026
- Length: 44:20
- Labels: LVRN; Interscope
- Producers: Bndries; JB Brown; Rogét Chahayed; Childish Major; Justin Cho; Darko; Dos Dias; Fwdslxsh; Alex Goldblatt; AJ Hall; Mike Hector; Kill September; Trey Lander; Loof; Los Hendrix; Malik Ninety Five; MW; Ninetyfour; Oz; Nikhil Ramnarayan; Reske; Tane Runo; Scribz Riley; Noah Sills; Slimwav; Smile High; Spiff Sinatra; Sucuki; Jesse Tyler; Whosantoine; Xynothing; Yuli

6lack chronology
Since I Have a Lover (2023)	Love Is the New Gangsta (2026)

Singles from Love Is the New Gangsta
- 1. "Bird Flu" Released: March 20, 2026; 2. "Sunday Again" Released: April 17, 2026; 3. "Ashin' the Blunt" Released: May 8, 2026

Love Is the New Gangsta is the fourth studio album by the American singer 6lack. It was released on May 22, 2026, through LVRN and Interscope Records.

== Background and release ==
On March 17, 2026, 6lack announced his new album would be titled Love Is the New Gangsta, along with the first single "Bird Flu", which was later released on March 20, 2026. The second single, "Sunday Again" with 2 Chainz, was released on April 17, 2026. The third single, "Ashin' the Blunt" with Young Thug, was released on May 8, 2026.

The full tracklist was released on May 15, 2026.

== Themes ==
According to Billboard, the music video for "Sunday Again" showcases "what [6lack] describes as a moment of community and serenity, reflecting the album's central theme of universal love." Rolling Stone noted that space and contemplation are the "ultimate foundation" of Love Is the New Gangsta. In their interview, 6lack talked about his revelations about his mental health while working with Childish Major saying:

I just started to vent and have open conversations about what I was going through, and we just knew we had to make an album about it. It was like this ongoing session of therapy, accountability, and being creative. Whether talking or jamming to guitar and keys, everything just kind of meshed together, and songs started to spill out. We just started cooking up. It was fun.

== Track listing ==
Love Is the New Gangsta track listing
No.	Title	Writer(s)	Producer(s)	Length
1.	"Bounty"	Ricardo Valentine; Adeyinka Bankole; Douglas Ford; Tomi Mannonen; Ville Rosqvist	Bndries; Fwdslxsh; Kill September	2:04
2.	"Bird Flu"	Valentine; Tim Friedrich; Louis Leibfried; Malik Sanders	Fwdslxsh; Loof; Malik Ninety Five; Sucuki	2:58
3.	"All That Matters" (with Leon Thomas and AZ Chike)	Valentine; Jerome Monroe Jr.; Ben Silverstein; Leon Thomas III; Damaria Walker	AJ Hall; Childish Major; Slimwav; Smile High	3:43
4.	"Foot on My Neck"	Valentine; Trey Lander; Carlos Muñoz; Markus Randle; Tane Runo	Childish Major; Lander; Los Hendrix; Runo; Noah Sills; Yuli	3:11
5.	"Wifey Baby Mama"	Valentine	Mike Hector; MW	2:40
6.	"I Guess"	Valentine; David Bishop; Lander; Randle	Childish Major; Justin Cho; Dos Dias; Lander; Fwdslxsh^{[a]}	2:30
7.	"Ashin' the Blunt" (with Young Thug)	Valentine; Jeffery Lamar Williams	Oz; Reske	3:48
8.	"Trauma"	Valentine; Lander; Nikhil Ramnarayan; Randle; Runo; Taylor Tookes	Childish Major; Lander; Ramnarayan; Runo	2:16
9.	"Sunday Again" (with 2 Chainz)	Valentine; Justin Cho; Tauheed Epps; Lander; Randle	Childish Major^{[p]}; Cho; Lander; Jesse Tyler; Dos Dias^{[v]}	3:40
10.	"On Me" (with Odeal)	Valentine; Cho; Lander; Randle; Hillary Udanoh	JB Brown; Childish Major; Cho; Lander; Sills; Spiff Sinatra	3:02
11.	"Out of Body" (with Quiñ)	Valentine; Chloe George	Rogét Chahayed; Childish Major; Fwdslxsh; Scribz Riley	3:01
12.	"Running Late Freestyle" (with Mereba)	Valentine; Marian Mereba	Darko; Hector; Whosantoine; Xynothing	3:23
13.	"Vision"	Valentine; Randle	Childish Major	2:55
14.	"Bear"	Valentine; Charles Myers; Abigail Smith	Fwdslxsh; Ninetyfour	2:55
15.	"Story Is Mine" (bonus)	Valentine	Alex Goldblatt	2:08
Total length:				44:20

=== Note ===
- ^{^[p]} indicates a producer and vocal producer
- ^{^[a]} indicates an additional producer
- ^{^[v]} indicates a vocal producer

== Personnel ==
Credits are adapted from Tidal.

=== Musicians ===
- 6lack – vocals
- Fwdslxsh – programming (tracks 1, 2); bass, guitar (1, 6); keyboards (1, 11), percussion (1), drums (11)
- Bndries – bass, drums, guitar, keyboards, percussion, programming (1)
- Kill September – bass, drums, guitar, keyboards, percussion, programming (1)
- Louis Leibfried – background vocals, bass, guitar, programming (2)
- Sucuki – bass, keyboards (2)
- Tim Friedrich – keyboards, percussion (2)
- Malik Ninety Five – programming (2)
- Venna – saxophone (2)
- Childish Major – keyboards (3, 4, 8–11), background vocals (3, 6, 9, 10), programming (4, 6, 8–10, 13), vocal programming (6), drums (10, 13); bass, guitar, percussion (13)
- Slimwav – background vocals, bass, guitar (3)
- Smile High – keyboards (3)
- AJ Hall – programming (3)
- Leon Thomas – vocals (3)
- AZ Chike – vocals (3)
- Trey Lander – bass (4, 6, 8–11), drums (4, 9), guitar (6, 8, 9), programming (8, 9); keyboards, percussion (9)
- Tane Runo – keyboards (4, 8), guitar (4), programming (8), background vocals (13)
- Emilie Nicolas – background vocals (4)
- Los Hendrix – guitar (4)
- LightSkinKeisha – spoken word (4)
- Margaux Whitney – viola (4)
- Mike Hector – drums (5, 12)
- Justin Cho – guitar (6, 9–11)
- Dos Dias – background vocals (6, 9); drums, keyboards, programming, vocal programming (6)
- Fabo – background vocals (6)
- Young Thug – vocals (7)
- Nikhil Ramnarayan – cello (8)
- Taylor Tookes – violin (8)
- Serayah – background vocals (9, 10)
- Destin Laurel – background vocals (9)
- Jordan Ward – background vocals (9)
- Jesse Tyler – guitar, keyboards, piano (9)
- Noah Sills – alto saxophone, flute (10)
- Jared Brown – trombone (10)
- Spiff Sinatra – trumpet (10)
- Odeal – vocals (10)
- Scribz Riley – bass, guitar, keyboards, percussion, programming (11)
- Alex Blake – guitar (11)
- Quiñ – vocals (11)
- Mereba – vocals (12)
- Noah Scharf – background vocals (13)
- Yakob – strings (14)

=== Technical ===
- Ricardo Valentine – engineering
- Ben Silverstein – engineering (3)
- Shaan Singh – engineering (7)
- Elijah Forbes – engineering (8)
- Justin Cho – engineering (9)
- JT Gagarin – engineering assistance (2–4, 9, 14)
- Jon Castelli – mixing
- Bainz – mixing (7)
- Aresh Banaji – mixing assistance (7)
- Dale Becker – mastering
- Adam Burt – mastering assistance
- Katie Harvey – mastering assistance
- Noah McCorkle – mastering assistance

== Charts ==
Chart performance for Love Is the New Gangsta
Chart (2026)	Peak position
Australian Hip Hop/R&B Albums (ARIA)	24
Portuguese Streaming Albums (AFP)	192
US Billboard 200	154
US Top R&B/Hip-Hop Albums (Billboard)	49
