= Ex Calling =

2016 single by 6lack

Single by 6lack

from the album Free 6lack
- Released: July 25, 2016
- Recorded: 2016
- Genre: Alternative R&B
- Length: 3:31
- Label: LVRN; Interscope
- Songwriter(s): Nayvadius Wilburn; Joshua Luellen
- Producer(s): Southside; DZL

6lack singles chronology
| "Ex Calling" (2016) | "Prblms" (2016) |

Music video
- "Ex Calling" on YouTube

"Ex Calling" is the debut single by American singer 6lack. It was first released on May 17, 2016 before being released to streaming services on July 25, 2016 as the lead single from his debut studio album Free 6lack (2016). Produced by Southside and DZL, the song is a remix of "Perkys Calling" by American rapper Future from the mixtape Purple Reign (2016).

== Background ==
In an interview with Genius, 6lack revealed the song was referring to all of his previous romantic partners. He stated, "'Ex Calling' was literally a collage of all my exes. I just combined them into one mega ex and just made a song about all of them. She was in there somewhere. I just fused them all into the greatest ex of all time."

== Composition ==
The production contains sparse piano and "alternating bass kicks that speed up the pace". Lyrically, 6lack reflects on his past relationships, especially dealing with his self-growth following a toxic relationship and refusal to answer the phone when his ex calls him.

== Music video ==
The music video was released on December 5, 2016. Shot in black-and-white, it sees 6lack wandering through town and visiting a strip club, where he throws money on some dancers.

== Charts ==
| Chart (2017) | Peak position |
|---|---|
| US Bubbling Under Hot 100 (Billboard) | 24 |
| US Bubbling Under R&B/Hip-Hop Singles (Billboard) | 3 |

== Certifications ==
| Region | Certification | Certified units/sales |
|---|---|---|
| Canada (Music Canada) | 2× Platinum | 160,000^{‡} |
| New Zealand (RMNZ) | Gold | 15,000^{‡} |
| United States (RIAA) | 2× Platinum | 2,000,000^{‡} |
^{‡} Sales+streaming figures based on certification alone.
