= Destined 2 Win =

Studio album by Lil Tjay
- Released: April 2, 2021
- Recorded: December 2020–2021
- Genres: Hip-hop; trap
- Length: 64:01
- Label: Columbia
- Producers: 101Slide; 808Melo; ACG Burna; AriaTheProducer; Avery on the Beat; Bordeaux; CashMoneyAP; Cassius Jay; Cubeatz; D Mac; G. Ry; Jabari; Jay Bunkin; Kiwi; Lbeats; Minor2Go; Non Native; Omari Clarke; OG Parker; Othello; Patron; Petruccio; Ricci; SephGotTheWaves; Smash David; Sweet; Tahj Money; TnTXD; Woodpecker

Lil Tjay chronology
State of Emergency (2020)	Destined 2 Win (2021)	222 (2023)

Singles from Destined 2 Win
- 1. "Losses" Released: October 30, 2020; 2. "Move On" Released: November 20, 2020; 3. "None of Your Love" Released: December 4, 2020; 4. "Calling My Phone" Released: February 12, 2021; 5. "Headshot" Released: March 19, 2021; 6. "Born 2 Be Great" Released: March 31, 2021

Destined 2 Win is the second studio album by American rapper Lil Tjay. It was released on April 2, 2021, through Columbia Records. This serves as the follow-up to his 2019 debut album "True 2 Myself". The production on the album was handled by multiple producers including Smash David, CashMoneyAP, 808Melo, Cubeatz and OG Parker among others. The album also features guest appearances from 6lack, Polo G, Fivio Foreign, Saweetie, Tyga, Toosii, Offset, and Moneybagg Yo.

Destined 2 Win was supported by six singles: "Losses", "Move On", "None of Your Love", "Calling My Phone", "Headshot" and "Born 2 Be Great". The album received generally positive reviews from music critics and was a commercial success. It debuted at number five on the US Billboard 200 chart, earning 62,000 album-equivalent units, in its first week. On January 12, 2023, the album was certified platinum.

== Background ==
Merritt began teasing his second studio album in 2020. The album's title describes the reflections on his highlights and accomplishments.

== Recording and Composition ==
Merritt began recording the album in May 2020 in Los Angeles. The album was eventually wrapped up in early 2021. Destined 2 Win is a hip-hop album, incorporating elements of R&B, trap, emo rap and drill.

== Promotion ==
=== Album documentary ===
Prior to the album's release, Merritt premiered the first part of the album's documentary that was directed by Sam Balaban on his YouTube channel. The documentary gives a behind-the-scenes look at the album's creation.

=== Music videos ===
The music video for "Run It Up" featuring Offset and Moneybagg Yo was released on April 3, 2021.

The music video for "Oh Well" was released on April 4, 2021.

The music video for "Love Hurts" featuring Toosii was released on April 7, 2021.

=== Live performances ===
Lil Tjay and 6lack performed their song "Calling My Phone" on The Tonight Show Starring Jimmy Fallon on April 5, 2021.

== Singles ==
The album's lead single "Losses" was released on October 30, 2020. It was accompanied by a music video on the same day.

The second single "Move On" was released on November 20, 2020. The song was announced on Tjay's Twitter, 3 days prior to the single's release revealing the song's covert art, title, and release date. It was accompanied by a music video directed by David Karp and Courtney Loo, the following day.

The third single "None of Your Love" was released on December 4, 2020. The song contains interpolates from Justin Bieber, and Ludacris' 2010 song "Baby". It was previously released on Merritt's YouTube channel but due to the sample, Bieber requested to remove the song and Merritt was unable to clear the sample. However, on December 1, 2020, Bieber eventually allowed Merritt to release the song to streaming services.

The fourth single "Calling My Phone" was released on February 12, 2021, featuring American singer 6lack and was accompanied by a music video that premiered on the same day. The song was previously teased on Merritt's social media. A teaser for the song was released on February 5 revealing its title and release date and that an unknown feature will appear on the song. Speculations on the feature for the song began to spread and was eventually confirmed on February 8 on a Twitter post that the feature would be 6lack.

The fifth single "Headshot" was released on March 19, 2021, with frequent collaborator Polo G, and American rapper Fivio Foreign. The song was announced via an Instagram live stream on March 15, 4 days before its initial release. It was accompanied by a music video that was released on March 23. In an interview with Zane Lowe and Apple Music of how the song came together, Merritt said the collaborators meshed immediately. He further elaborated saying

"It was just magic, on-site. It was no, no copy and paste. It was magic," Merritt said. "I mean, it was just like, it was high energy. You know, everybody wants to come poke their chest out on the record. Everybody wants to perform, you know what I’m saying? So I felt like, in my opinion, I feel like the song just sound like three stars."

The sixth and final single "Born 2 Be Great" was released on March 31, 2021. The song reminisces Merritt's troubled childhood in which he and his friends went through trouble to get where he is today.

== Critical reception ==
Professional ratings
Review scores
Source	Rating
AllMusic	3.5/5 stars
Clash Music	7/10
HotNewHipHop	(positive)

Robin Murray of Clash Music praises Lil Tjay progression, calling the album a "A deft step outside of hood braggadocio". Murray also said the album truly thrives when Lil Tjay leaves his feelings and his creativity exposed. Overall, Murray gave the album a rating of 7 out of 10. Rose Lilah of HotNewHipHop also praised Tjay's progression with this album, stating that "While Destined 2 Win may keep certain themes intact from Tjay’s debut album, True 2 Myself, and his early success in general, the growth on this album is still evident, and it’s part of what makes Tjay such an exciting artist to follow." Lilah also said that "As a fan, we are able to clearly witness an evolution in real time." Lilah also spoke highly about the progression of Tjay's sophomore effort saying that "It also leaves the listener wanting more: whether that be through a quick replay or through the next song, it reels you in to Tjay’s personal journey, from juvenile detention to worldwide fame." Overall, Lilah believes Lil Tjay is manifesting his destiny, stating that "On Destined 2 Win, the young artist makes it known that this is a role he not only takes seriously, but one he plans to succeed in, no matter what."

== Commercial performance ==
Destined 2 Win debuted at number five on the US Billboard 200 chart, earning 62,000 album-equivalent units, (including 3,000 copies in pure album sales) in its first week. This became Lil Tjay's second US top ten debut on the chart, matching True 2 Myself which also peaked at number five. The album also accumulated a total of 86.14 million on-demand streams from the album's songs. In its second week, the album dropped to number eight on the chart, earning an additional 38,000 units. On July 12, 2021, the album was certified gold by the Recording Industry Association of America (RIAA) for combined sales and album-equivalent units of over 500,000 units in the United States. As of September 2021, the album has earned 570,000 album-equivalent units in the United States. On January 12, 2023, the album was certified platinum.

== Track listing ==
Destined 2 Win track listing
No.	Title	Writer(s)	Producer(s)	Length
1.	"Destined 2 Win"	Tione Merritt; Othello Kwaidah; Dennis Lambert; Brian Potter; Will Jetter	Othello	1:03
2.	"Born 2 Be Great"	Merritt; Brendan Walsh; Luis Campozano; Jahron Braithwaite; Matthew Samuels; Allen Ritter; Rupert Thomas; Aubrey Graham; Robyn Fenty; Monte Moir; Richard Stephenson	Bordeaux; Non Native	2:50
3.	"Calling My Phone" (with 6lack)	Merritt; Ricardo Valentine Jr.; Walsh; Campozano; Ryan Martínez	Bordeaux; Non Native; G. Ry	3:25
4.	"What You Wanna Do"	Merritt; Jabari Voss; Aria Izadpanah; Dekembe Perry; Onton Mitchell; Sheldon Lawrence; Rojay Laboissiere	Jabari; AriaTheProducer	4:05
5.	"Hood Rich"	Merritt; Jay Bunkin	Jay Bunkin	3:09
6.	"Oh Well"	Merritt; Bunkin	Bunkin	3:13
7.	"Headshot" (with Polo G and Fivio Foreign)	Merritt; Taurus Bartlett; Maxie Ryles III; Walsh; Tampozano; Tahj Vaughn; Thomas Horton; David McDowell	Bordeaux; Non Native; Tahj Money; TnTXD; Dmac; 101Slide	2:24
8.	"Gang Gang"	Merritt; Lester Williams, Jr.	Lbeats	3:50
9.	"Go Crazy"	Merritt; Andre Loblack; Kevin Gomringer; Tim Gomringer	808Melo; Cubeatz	3:48
10.	"Irregular Love"	Merritt; Walsh; Tampozano; Omari Clarke; Lopeti Halatuituia; Jamaal Jones	Bordeaux; Non Native; Omari Clarke; Ricci; Joseph Davinci	2:18
11.	"Move" (with Tyga featuring Saweetie)	Merritt; Michael Nguyen-Stevenson; Diamonté Harper; Joshua Parker; Samuel Jimenez; Martínez; Paul Poli; Shaffer Smith; Teedra Moses; Cortez Harris; Dorothy Runner; Stephane Reibaldi	OG Parker; Smash David; G. Ry; Patron	3:34
12.	"Slow Down"	Merritt; Joshua Cross; Jesse Weaver, Jr.	Cassius Jay	2:51
13.	"Love Hurts" (featuring Toosii)	Merritt; Nau'Jour Grainger; Caleb Hedberg	Kiwi	3:42
14.	"Run It Up" (featuring Offset and Moneybagg Yo)	Merritt; Kiari Cephus; Demario White, Jr.; Josh Petruccio	Petruccio	3:04
15.	"Part of the Plan"	Merritt; Craig Edwards	ACG Burna	4:20
16.	"No Cap"	Merritt; Gunnlaugur Sumarlidason	Glazer	3:01
17.	"Life Changed"	Merritt; Joseph Boyden; McDowell	SephGotTheWaves; Dmac	3:00
18.	"Nuf Said"	Merritt; Jahaan Sweet	Sweet	1:39
19.	"Losses" (bonus track)	Merritt; Levi De Jong	Woodpecker	3:15
20.	"Move On" (bonus track)	Merritt; Avery Cockerill	Avery on the Beat; Minor2Go	2:57
21.	"None of Your Love" (bonus track)	Merritt; Alex Petit; Justin Bieber; Christopher Bridges; Christopher Stewart; Terius Nash; Christina Flores	CashMoneyAP	2:33
Total length:				64:01

Sample credits

- "Calling My Phone" contains samples from "How I Been", performed by YoungBoy Never Broke Again
- "None of Your Love" contains samples from "Baby", performed by Justin Bieber featuring Ludacris
- "Born 2 Be Great" contains samples from "Work", performed by Rihanna featuring Drake

== Personnel ==
Credits adapted from Tidal.

- Bordeaux – mixing engineer (all tracks), mastering engineer (7, 19), recording engineer (7)
- Eric Lagg – mastering engineer (1–6, 8–18)
- Todd Hurtt – recording engineer (1)
- Tweek Tune – recording engineer (2, 9, 20)
- JT Gagarin – recording engineer (3)
- Barrington Hall – recording engineer (3, 4, 8–10, 14, 17, 18)
- Mitch Kenny – recording engineer (4, 17)
- Drü Oliver – recording engineer (5, 7, 15, 19)
- Randy Urbanski – recording engineer (6)
- Christian "CQ" Quinonez – recording engineer (11)
- David Cabrera – recording engineer (12)
- Jadon John – recording engineer (13)
- Brandyn Marko – recording engineer (16)
- Nick Cavalieri – recording engineer (21)

== Charts ==
=== Weekly charts ===
Chart performance for Destined 2 Win
Chart (2021)	Peak position
Australian Albums (ARIA)	9
Belgian Albums (Ultratop Flanders)	19
Belgian Albums (Ultratop Wallonia)	100
Canadian Albums (Billboard)	2
Danish Albums (Hitlisten)	5
Dutch Albums (Album Top 100)	6
Finnish Albums (Suomen virallinen lista)	23
German Albums (Offizielle Top 100)	81
Irish Albums (Official Charts)	14
Italian Albums (FIMI)	51
Lithuanian Albums (AGATA)	13
New Zealand Albums (RMNZ)	23
Norwegian Albums (VG-lista)	3
Swedish Albums (Sverigetopplistan)	35
Swiss Albums (Schweizer Hitparade)	12
UK Albums (Official Charts)	7
UK R&B Albums (Official Charts)	34
US Billboard 200	5
US Top R&B/Hip-Hop Albums (Billboard)	2

=== Year-end charts ===
Year-end chart performance for Destined 2 Win
Chart (2021)	Position
Danish Albums (Hitlisten)	70
US Billboard 200	90
US Top R&B/Hip-Hop Albums (Billboard)	46

== Certifications ==
Certifications for Destined 2 Win
Region	Certification	Certified units/sales
Canada (Music Canada)	Platinum	80,000^{‡}
Denmark (IFPI Danmark)	Platinum	20,000^{‡}
New Zealand (RMNZ)	Platinum	15,000^{‡}
United Kingdom (BPI)	Gold	100,000^{‡}
United States (RIAA)	Platinum	1,000,000^{‡}
^{‡} Sales+streaming figures based on certification alone.
