= Know My Rights =

2020 single by 6lack featuring Lil Baby

Single by 6lack featuring Lil Baby

from the album 6pc Hot EP
- Released: June 26, 2020
- Recorded: 2020
- Length: 3:14
- Label: LoveRenaissance; Interscope
- Songwriters: Ricardo Valentine; Dominique Jones; Joe Reeves; Trevor Slade; Yinka Bankole; Fwdslxsh
- Producer: London Cyr

6lack singles chronology
"Float" (2020)	"Know My Rights" (2020)	"Touch & Go (Remix)" (2020)

Lil Baby singles chronology
"Monday to Sunday" (2020)	"Know My Rights" (2020)	"Back At It" (2020)

Music video
- "Know My Rights" on YouTube

"Know My Rights" is a song by American singer 6lack, featuring American rapper Lil Baby. It was released on June 26, 2020, as the third single off 6lack's 6pc Hot EP, released the same day. The track was produced by London Cyr and Fwdslxsh, who also executive-produced 6pc Hot EP.

== Background and composition ==
Canadian producer London Cyr explained to Genius how the song came about: "Basically, my boy Fwdslxsh, he executive produced the EP, he's a producer from London. He was like, 'Yo, come to the studio we are going to work on some ideas for 6lack'. I was like alright and then we made the beat the day Kobe [Bryant] died". Cyr did the melody, while Fwdslxsh "pulled it up and did a little drum idea on it" - 808s and hi-hats. British producer Joe Reeves added guitar to the song, and Cyr added another melody and changed around the drum pattern. Cyr further recalled how he envisioned the sound: "I wanted to create something that was kind of like spacey and floaty. I added a little synth lead on it too, it's just fire. I had made that melody probably like six months before we made the beat. So, yeah when I made the melody I was actually like, 'Lil Baby needs to be on this'". Lyrically, the song finds the two artists flaunting their success and music talents.

== Music video ==
The official video, directed by JMP, was released concurrently with the song, on June 26, 2020. 6lack is seen surrounded by luxury cars in the visual, recording in studio, racing cars and in front of his jet. Lil Baby does not appear in the video.

=== Concept ===
The video opens with 6lack in his private jet being raided by police. Hypebeast's Nia Groce said that scene "provides a poignant contrast against the cocky bars he's spitting all the while. Lil Baby's vocals add a confident entrance later on in the song as 6LACK is surrounded by an impressive mix of cars, with the artist making sure to don his face mask as necessary".

== Charts ==
Chart (2020)	Peak position
New Zealand Hot Singles (RMNZ)	9
US Billboard Hot 100	75
US Hot R&B/Hip-Hop Songs (Billboard)	33
US Rolling Stone Top 100	46
