= Calling My Phone =

2021 single by Lil Tjay featuring 6lack

Single by Lil Tjay featuring 6lack

from the album Destined 2 Win
- Released: February 10, 2021
- Genre: R&B
- Length: 3:25
- Label: Columbia; Sony
- Songwriters: Tione Merritt; Ricardo Valentine, Jr.; Brendan Walsh; Luis Campozano; Ryan Martínez; Henock "LilH" Siyoum
- Producers: Bordeaux; G. Ry; Non Native

Lil Tjay singles chronology
"None of Your Love" (2020)	"Calling My Phone" (2021)	"Headshot" (2021)

6lack singles chronology
"You Ain't Worth It" (2020)	"Calling My Phone" (2021)	"VIP *-*" (2021)

Music video
- "Calling My Phone" on YouTube

"Calling My Phone" is a song by American rapper and singer Lil Tjay featuring fellow American singer 6lack. It was released on February 10, 2021, through Columbia and Sony as the fourth single the former's second studio Destined 2 Win (2021).

== Background ==
The song was steadily teased by Tjay on Twitter and TikTok among other social media accounts starting in December 2020. Intended as a Valentine's Day gift to his fans, the artist announced the release of the single on February 4, 2021. A teaser for the song was released on February 5 revealing its title and release date and that an unknown feature will appear on the song. Speculations on the feature for the song began to spread and was eventually confirmed on February 8 on a Twitter post that the feature would be 6lack. Originally, American singer-songwriter SZA was going to be on "Calling My Phone", but she scrapped her verse because she thought she would not add anything valuable to the song; this became public knowledge years later in June 2023, when her verse leaked online and all three artists acknowledged it.

== Composition ==
Generally, the "lovelorn" song talks about trying to escape "the grasp of a former lover, who can't seem to understand that the relationship has ended" while "Tjay wrestles with the demise of a relationship" and 6lack "holds down the hook". It was furthermore described as "introspective", with Tjay reflecting "on a relationship coming to an end over a slowed piano sample and moody bass, settling perfectly in that particular tone that Atlanta crooner 6lack thrives in."

== Music video ==
The music video was released on February 12, 2021, and was directed by Cam Busby. It mainly features the rappers going through different situations while trying to move on from past relationships. It has more than 138 million views as of April 2022.

== Commercial performance ==
In the United States, "Calling My Phone" debuted at number three on the Billboard Hot 100 chart, number two on the Global 200, and number one on the Canadian Hot 100, becoming both Lil Tjay and 6lack's highest-charting single and first top 10 on all charts.

== Credits and personnel ==
Credits adapted from Tidal.

- Lil Tjay – vocals, songwriting, composition
- 6lack – vocals, songwriting, composition
- Brendan Walsh – songwriting, composition, production
- Luis Campozano – songwriting, composition, production
- Ryan Martínez – songwriting, composition, production
- Eric Lagg – master engineering
- Barrington Hall – recording engineering
- JT Gagarin – recording engineering
- Henock Siyoum – composition, melody

== Charts ==
=== Weekly charts ===
Chart performance for "Calling My Phone"
Chart (2021)	Peak position
Australia (ARIA)	3
Austria (Ö3 Austria Top 40)	19
Belgium (Ultratop 50 Flanders)	45
Canada Hot 100 (Billboard)	1
Czech Republic Singles Digital (ČNS IFPI)	75
Denmark (Tracklisten)	8
Finland (Suomen virallinen lista)	16
France (SNEP)	110
Germany (GfK)	32
Global 200 (Billboard)	2
Hungary (Stream Top 40)	16
Iceland (Tónlistinn)	10
Ireland (IRMA)	2
Lithuania (AGATA)	9
Netherlands (Single Top 100)	12
New Zealand (Recorded Music NZ)	2
Norway (VG-lista)	3
Portugal (AFP)	6
Slovakia (Singles Digitál Top 100)	31
Sweden (Sverigetopplistan)	14
Switzerland (Schweizer Hitparade)	10
UK Singles (OCC)	2
UK Hip Hop/R&B (OCC)	1
US Billboard Hot 100	3
US Hot R&B/Hip-Hop Songs (Billboard)	1
US Pop Airplay (Billboard)	30
US Rhythmic Airplay (Billboard)	1

=== Year-end charts ===
Year-end chart performance for "Calling My Phone"
Chart (2021)	Position
Australia (ARIA)	38
Canada (Canadian Hot 100)	42
Global 200 (Billboard)	75
Iceland (Tónlistinn)	64
Portugal (AFP)	70
UK Singles (OCC)	48
US Billboard Hot 100	33
US Hot R&B/Hip-Hop Songs (Billboard)	9
US Rhythmic (Billboard)	24

== Certifications ==
Certifications for "Calling My Phone"
Region	Certification	Certified units/sales
Australia (ARIA)	Platinum	70,000^{‡}
Canada (Music Canada)	4× Platinum	320,000^{‡}
Denmark (IFPI Danmark)	Platinum	90,000^{‡}
France (SNEP)	Gold	100,000^{‡}
Italy (FIMI)	Gold	50,000^{‡}
New Zealand (RMNZ)	2× Platinum	60,000^{‡}
Portugal (AFP)	Platinum	10,000^{‡}
Spain (Promusicae)	Gold	30,000^{‡}
United Kingdom (BPI)	Platinum	600,000^{‡}
United States (RIAA)	5× Platinum	5,000,000^{‡}
Streaming
Sweden (GLF)	Gold	4,000,000^{†}
^{‡} Sales+streaming figures based on certification alone.^{†} Streaming-only figures based on certification alone.
