= Run It Up (Lil Tjay song) =

Song by Lil Tjay featuring Offset and Moneybagg Yo

Song by Lil Tjay featuring Offset and Moneybagg Yo

from the album Destined 2 Win
- Released: April 2, 2021
- Length: 3:04
- Label: Columbia
- Songwriters: Tione Merritt; Kiari Cephus; Demario White, Jr.; Josh Petruccio
- Producer: Petruccio

Music video
- "Run It Up" on YouTube

"Run It Up" is a song by American rapper Lil Tjay featuring fellow American rappers Offset and Moneybagg Yo. Written alongside producer Josh Petruccio, it was released on April 2, 2021 as a track from the former's second studio album Destined 2 Win, accompanied by an official music video.

== Composition ==
The song features a "melancholic piano loop and some up-tempo percussion" in the instrumental. Lil Tjay begins with the first verse, on which he "proves why he's one of the game's standout newcomers", before Offset and Moneybagg Yo rap the second and third verses respectively. The three rap about their individual lifestyles, which involve "foreign cars and blinged-out jewelry".

== Music video ==
The music was directed by Whipalo. It opens with Lil Tjay in a garage, flaunting a "lavish car collection" and his money. As Offset performs his verse, a gray BMW does donuts around him. Moneybagg Yo raps next to some cars as well. In the ending, Lil Tjay "makes it rain in the middle of a blazing fire inside the garage".

== Charts ==
Chart (2021)	Peak position
Canada Hot 100 (Billboard)	26
Global 200 (Billboard)	51
Ireland (IRMA)	76
New Zealand Hot Singles (RMNZ)	8
UK Singles (Official Charts)	63
US Billboard Hot 100	50
US Hot R&B/Hip-Hop Songs (Billboard)	26

== Certifications ==
Region	Certification	Certified units/sales
Canada (Music Canada)	2× Platinum	160,000^{‡}
New Zealand (RMNZ)	Gold	15,000^{‡}
United Kingdom (BPI)	Silver	200,000^{‡}
United States (RIAA)	2× Platinum	2,000,000^{‡}
^{‡} Sales+streaming figures based on certification alone.
