= OTW (Khalid, Ty Dolla Sign and 6lack song) =

Single by Khalid, Ty Dolla Sign and 6lack
- Released: April 20, 2018
- Genre: R&B
- Length: 4:23
- Label: RCA
- Songwriters: Khalid Robinson; Ricardo Valentine; Tyrone Griffin Jr.; Paul Jefferies; Brian Alexander Morgan; Idan Kalai
- Producer: Nineteen85

Khalid singles chronology
"Lovely" (2018)	"OTW" (2018)	"Youth" (2018)

6lack singles chronology
"Cutting Ties" (2018)	"OTW" (2018)	"Switch" (2018)

Ty Dolla Sign singles chronology
"Off Guard" (2018)	"OTW" (2018)	"Accelerate" (2018)

Music video
- "OTW" on YouTube

"OTW" (an acronym for "on the way") is a song by American singers Khalid, Ty Dolla Sign, and 6lack. The artists wrote the song with Brian Alexander Morgan, Idan Kalai and producer Nineteen85. It was released by RCA Records on April 20, 2018, as a stand-alone single, and also added as a bonus track to the vinyl of Khalid's EP Suncity (2018).

== Release ==
On March 31, 2018, Khalid posted a snippet of the song on Twitter. He officially announced the single during the nominations announcement for the 2018 Billboard Music Awards.

== Composition ==
"OTW" is a dark and melodic R&B song with '90s influences. It features a "silky smooth" and "mellow" production, backed by "a trap-infused R&B beat". A booty-call theme channels throughout the track, as the artists sing about meeting up with a love interest.

== Critical reception ==
Michael Love Michael of Paper regarded the song as "a refreshing slice of smooth, radio-ready, but throwback '90s R&B". He praised the song's "undercurrent of bittersweet melancholy characteristic of the genre's most forward-thinking productions", describing it as "an addictively rhythmic tune". MTV News' Ross McNeilage wrote: "The slick and sultry track is a nice extension from the sound of his debut album, and 6LACK and Ty Dolla $ign complement the song perfectly." Devin Ch of HotNewHipHop praised Khalid's songwriting talents, writing that "all performers adhere to the general 'vibe' of the song". Lauren O'Neill of Noisey described the song as a destined summer track, writing that it "feels most like a head massage you'll hear all week". He complimented Khalid's ability to produce a "relentlessly catchy but also somehow extremely laid back hook".

== Music video ==
The music video for "OTW", directed by Calmatic, premiered via Khalid's Vevo channel on July 3, 2018.

== Credits and personnel ==
Credits adapted from Tidal.

- Nineteen85 – production
- Denis Kosiak – mix engineering, record engineering
- Chris Athens – master engineering
- Andy Barnes – record engineering
- JT Gagarin – record engineering

== Charts ==
=== Weekly charts ===
Chart (2018)	Peak position
Australia (ARIA)	27
Belgium (Ultratip Bubbling Under Flanders)	18
Canada Hot 100 (Billboard)	30
Czech Republic Singles Digital (ČNS IFPI)	69
Denmark (Tracklisten)	20
Ireland (IRMA)	57
Netherlands (Single Top 100)	50
New Zealand (Recorded Music NZ)	11
Portugal (AFP)	37
Slovakia Singles Digital (ČNS IFPI)	37
Sweden (Sverigetopplistan)	52
UK Singles (Official Charts)	60
US Billboard Hot 100	57
US Hot R&B Songs (Billboard)	6
US Hot R&B/Hip-Hop Songs (Billboard)	35
US Rhythmic Airplay (Billboard)	14

=== Year-end charts ===
Chart (2018)	Position
Australia (ARIA)	96
Canada (Canadian Hot 100)	96
Portugal (AFP)	162
US Hot R&B/Hip-Hop Songs (Billboard)	74
Chart (2019)	Position
US Hot R&B Songs (Billboard)	35

== Certifications ==
Region	Certification	Certified units/sales
Australia (ARIA)	3× Platinum	210,000^{‡}
Brazil (Pro-Música Brasil)	Platinum	40,000^{‡}
Canada (Music Canada)	2× Platinum	160,000^{‡}
Denmark (IFPI Danmark)	Platinum	90,000^{‡}
New Zealand (RMNZ)	3× Platinum	90,000^{‡}
United Kingdom (BPI)	Gold	400,000^{‡}
United States (RIAA)	2× Platinum	2,000,000^{‡}
Streaming
Sweden (GLF)	Gold	4,000,000^{†}
^{‡} Sales+streaming figures based on certification alone.^{†} Streaming-only figures based on certification alone.

== Release history ==
Region	Date	Format	Label	Ref.
Various	April 20, 2018	Digital download; streaming	RCA	
United States	June 5, 2018	Urban contemporary radio	RCA	
