= Free 6lack =

Studio album by 6lack
- Released: November 18, 2016
- Recorded: 2016
- Genre: Alternative R&B; hip hop; R&B
- Length: 58:21
- Label: LVRN; Interscope
- Producer: 6lack; Alex Leone; Bizness Boi; Breyan Isaac; Childish Major; Dot da Genius; DZL; Erik Jensen; Frank Dukes; FWDSLXSH; Jakob Rabitsch; Jon Castelli; JT Gagarin; Julian Beats; Karl Rubin; Lucian Blomkamp; OZ; MDS; Nova; Roofeeo; Singawd; Southside; Stwo; Syk Sense; Take a Daytrip

6lack chronology
Free 6lack (2016)	East Atlanta Love Letter (2018)

Singles from Free 6lack
- 1. "Ex Calling" Released: July 25, 2016; 2. "Prblms" Released: September 23, 2016

Free 6lack is the debut studio album by American singer 6lack. It was released on November 18, 2016, by LVRN and Interscope Records. The album was supported by two singles: "Ex Calling" and "Prblms". It was nominated at the 60th Annual Grammy Awards for Best Urban Contemporary Album.

== Release ==
On November 13, 2017, three additional new songs were added to the album to celebrate the album's anniversary.

== Singles ==
The first single from the album, "Ex Calling", was released on July 25, 2016. The song contains samples of "Perkys Calling" by Future from the mixtape Purple Reign. The music video for "Ex Calling" was released on December 5, 2016.

The second single from the album, "Prblms", was released on September 23, 2016. The music video for "Problems", featuring 6lack rapping next to a grizzly bear, was released on October 14, 2016.

== Commercial performance ==
Free 6lack debuted at number 68 on the US Billboard 200 for the chart dated December 10, 2016 and has since peaked at number 34.

== Track listing ==
Free 6lack track listing
No.	Title	Writer(s)	Producer(s)	Length
1.	"Never Know"	Ricardo Valentine; Adeyinka Bankole; Aleksi Asiala; Ali Zafar; Adam Feeney; Santeri Kauppinen	FWDSLXSH; MDS; Alex Leone; Frank Dukes^{[c]}	4:09
2.	"Rules"	Valentine; Trevor Slade; David Moreau-Hispard; Joshua Scruggs; Ozan Yildirim	Syk Sense; OZ; Singawd	3:31
3.	"Prblms"	Valentine; Jeryn Peters	Nova	4:06
4.	"Free"	Valentine; Peters	Nova; Singawd^{[c]}	4:23
5.	"Learn Ya"	Valentine; Slade; Jakob Rabitsch; Harry Edwards	Singawd; Rabitsch	3:35
6.	"MTFU"	Valentine; Bankole; Andre Robertson	FWDSLXSH; Bizness Boi; JT Gagarin^{[b]}	3:28
7.	"Luving U"	Valentine; Slade; Matthew Kidd	Singawd	4:12
8.	"Gettin' Old"	Valentine; Breyan Isaac; Manny Mercado	Isaac	3:35
9.	"Worst Luck"	Valentine; Rabitsch; Slade; Jared Gagarin; David Biral; Denzel Michael-Akil Baptiste; Jahphet Landis; Karl Brutus	Rubin; Roofeeo; Childish Major; Rabitsch; Take a Daytrip; Singawd; 6lack; JT Gagarin	3:26
10.	"Ex Calling"	Nayvadius Wilburn; Joshua Luellen	Southside; DZL^{[c]}	3:31
11.	"Alone / EA6"	Valentine; Slade; Rabitsch; Oladipo Omishore; Lucian Blomkamp	Dot da Genius; Singawd; 6lack; Rabitsch	9:13
Total length:				47:00

Free 6lack – Bonus tracks
No.	Title	Writer(s)	Producer(s)	Length
12.	"Glock Six"	Valentine; Jon Castelli; Julian Bohorquez	Jon Castelli; JulianBeatz	3:10
13.	"In Between" (featuring Banks)	Valentine; Jillian Banks; Blomkamp; Slade; Rabitsch	Blomkamp; Singawd; Rabitsch	3:25
14.	"One Way" (featuring T-Pain)	Valentine; Faheem Najm; Slade; Blomkamp; Steven Vidal; Gagarin	Stwo; Singawd^{[b]}; Blomkamp^{[b]}; JT Gagarin^{[b]}	4:46
Total length:				58:21

Notes

- ^{^[a]} signifies a co-producer
- ^{^[b]} signifies an additional producer
- ^{^[c]} signifies an uncredited producer

Sample credits

- "Rules" contains samples of "Shadow Knows" performed by Aqua Nebula Oscillator.
- "Luving U" contains a sample of Slow Meadow's original composition "Lachrymosia".
- "Ex Calling" contains samples of "Perkys Calling" performed by Future.

== Personnel ==
Performers

- 6lack – primary artist

Production

- FWDSLXSH – producer (tracks 1, 6)
- MDS – producer (track 1)
- Alex Leone – producer (track 1)
- Frank Dukes – producer (track 1)
- Syk Sense – producer (track 2)
- OZ – producer (track 2)
- Singawd – producer (tracks 2, 4, 5, 7, 9, 11, 13), additional producer (track 14)
- Nova – producer (tracks 3, 4)
- Jakob Rabitsch – producer (tracks 5, 9, 11, 13)
- Bizness Boi – producer (track 6)
- Breyan Isaac – producer (track 8)
- Karl Rubin – producer (track 9)
- Roofeeo – producer (track 9)
- Childish Major – producer (track 9)
- Take A Daytrip – producer (track 9)
- 6lack – producer (tracks 9, 11)
- JT Gagarin – producer (tracks 9), additional producer (tracks 6, 14)
- Southside – producer (track 10)
- DZL – producer (track 10)
- Dot da Genius – producer (track 11)
- Jon Castelli – producer (track 12)
- Julian Beats – producer (track 12)
- Lucian Blomkamp – producer (tracks 13), additional producer (track 14)
- Stwo – producer (track 14)

Technical

- JT Gagarin – recording engineer (tracks 1, 2, 4–7, 9, 11, 13, 14), mixing engineer (tracks 13, 14)
- Jon Castelli – mixing engineer (tracks 1–12)

== Charts ==
=== Weekly charts ===
Weekly chart performance for Free 6lack
Chart (2016–2017)	Peak position
Canadian Albums (Billboard)	88
Latvian Albums (LaIPA)	54
US Billboard 200	34
US Top R&B/Hip-Hop Albums (Billboard)	11
US Top Rap Albums (Billboard)	5

=== Year-end charts ===
Year-end chart performance for Free 6lack
Chart (2017)	Position
US Billboard 200	83
US Top R&B/Hip-Hop Albums (Billboard)	38

== Certifications ==
Certifications for Free 6lack
Region	Certification	Certified units/sales
Canada (Music Canada)	Platinum	80,000^{‡}
Denmark (IFPI Danmark)	Gold	10,000^{‡}
United Kingdom (BPI)	Silver	60,000^{‡}
United States (RIAA)	Platinum	1,000,000^{‡}
^{‡} Sales+streaming figures based on certification alone.
