= 100 Gigs =

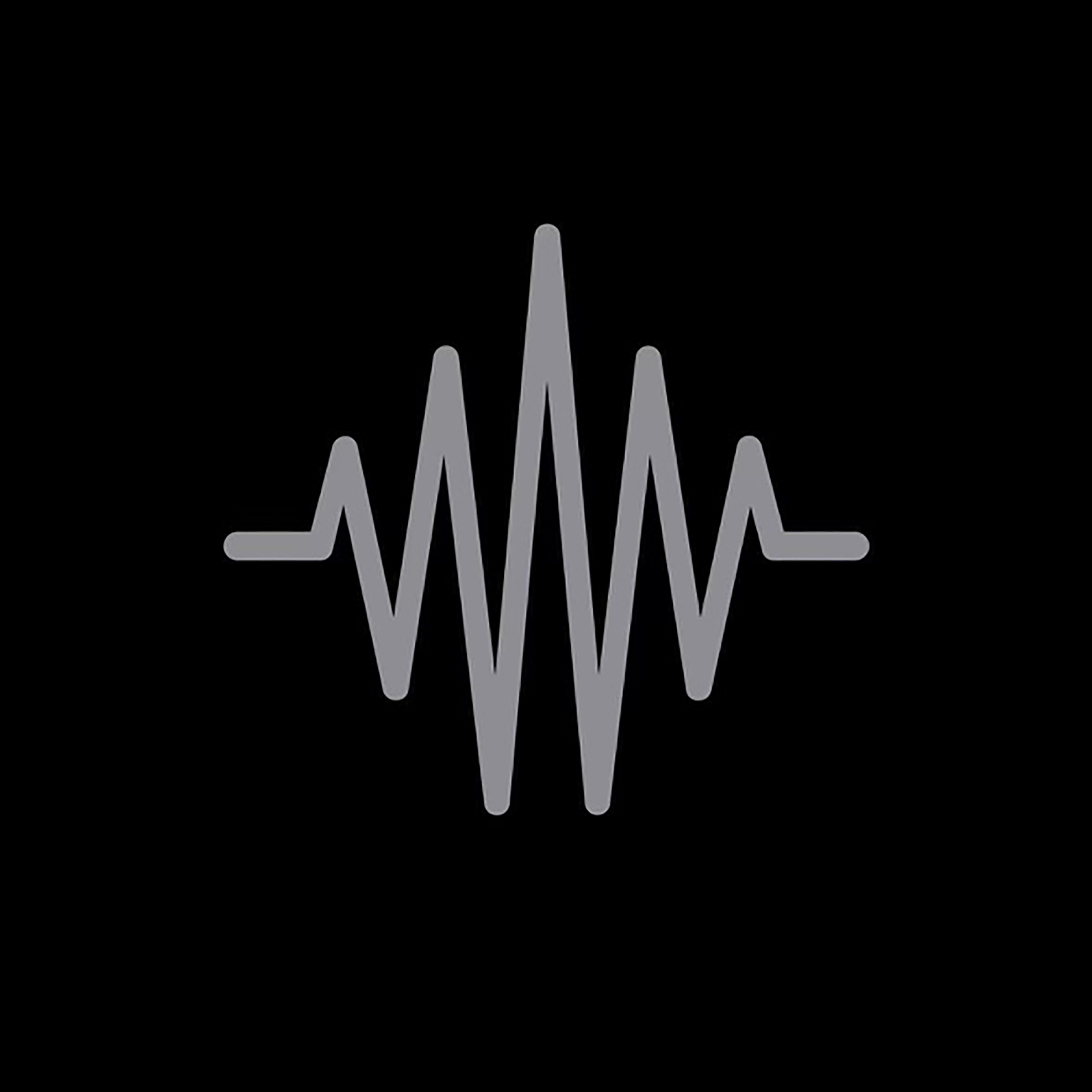

EP by Drake
- Released: August 10, 2024
- Genres: Hip-hop; trap
- Length: 15:46
- Labels: OVO; Republic
- Producers: 40; Ben10k; Boi-1da; Elyas; Gordo; Gyz; Klahr; Liohn; London Cyr; SmplGtwy; Tom Levesque

Drake chronology
For All the Dogs (2023)	100 Gigs (2024)	Some Sexy Songs 4 U (2025)

100 Gigs is the fifth extended play by Canadian rapper Drake. It was released on August 10, 2024, by OVO Sound and Republic Records. It features guest appearances from 21 Savage, Young Thug, and Latto. 100 Gigs also became Drake’s first extended play since Scary Hours 2 (2021). The EP followed his eighth studio album, For All the Dogs (2023).

== Background ==
On August 6, through a private Instagram page, Drake released 100 gigabytes of data, consisting of behind-the-scenes clips, tour rehearsals, and studio footage, including the three tracks on the EP on the Instagram page, alongside a website for its sole purpose. Upon the release of the tracks, 21 Savage's verse on "It's Up" was thought to contain disses towards Kendrick Lamar amidst the Drake–Kendrick Lamar feud; however, the rumours were later denounced by Savage's manager.

On August 23, 2024, through the same Instagram, Drake released three new tracks, "Circadian Rhythm", "SOD", previously featuring Lil Yachty, and "No Face", featuring Playboi Carti, who was removed from the streaming version of the track. Due to the samples in "Blue Green Red" not being cleared, it was later removed from streaming services and replaced with "Circadian Rhythm", while "No Face" was released later as a bonus track.

== Commercial performance ==
Similarly to Drake's previous extended plays, only the tracks charted in the United States. The highest charting track from 100 Gigs was "It's Up", debuting and peaking at number 28 on the US Billboard Hot 100. The song notably became Drake's 206th top-forty entry on the chart, further extending his record for the most top-40 entries on the chart. The other two tracks: "Blue Green Red" and "Housekeeping Knows" peaked at numbers 63 and 85 on the chart respectively. "No Face" and "Circadian Rhythm" entered the chart at numbers 60 and 69 respectively.

== Track listing ==
100 Gigs track listing
No.	Title	Writer(s)	Producer(s)	Length
1.	"It's Up" (with 21 Savage and Young Thug)	Aubrey Graham; Shéyaa Abraham-Joseph; Jeffery Williams; Benjamin Wilson; Elias Sticken; Gyz; James Cyr; Thomas Levesque	Ben10k; Elyas; Gyz; London Cyr; Tom Levesque	4:38
2.	"Blue Green Red"	Graham; Matthew Samuels; Noah Shebib; Mikey Samuels II	40; Boi-1da; SmplGtwy	3:38
3.	"Housekeeping Knows" (featuring Latto)	Graham; Alyssa Stephens; Diamanté Blackmon; Richard Zastenker; Johannes Klahr	Gordo; Liohn; Klahr	3:07
Total length:				11:23

Re-release
No.	Title	Writer(s)	Producer(s)	Length
1.	"Circadian Rhythm"	Graham	London Cyr; Ben10k; Eli Brown; Gordo	2:06
Total length:				2:06

Bonus track
No.	Title	Writer(s)	Producer(s)	Length
1.	"No Face"	Graham	London Cyr; Ben10k; DJ Lewis; Octavian	2:17
Total length:				2:17

Notes

- "Housekeeping Knows" features additional vocals from Gordo.
- "Blue Green Red" was replaced with "Circadian Rhythm" in the re-released version.
- "No Face" featured vocals from Playboi Carti in the original version, but were removed in the officially released version.

Sample credits

- "Blue Green Red" contains an interpolation of "When", written by Norman Washington Jackson, as performed by Tiger.
