= Prblms =

Single by 6lack

from the album Free 6lack
- Released: September 23, 2016
- Recorded: 2016
- Genre: Alternative R&B; trap; cloud rap; industrial
- Length: 4:06
- Label: LoveRenaissance; Interscope
- Songwriter(s): Ricardo Valentine; Jeryn Peters; Matthew Barnes; Mitchell West
- Producer(s): NOVA

6lack singles chronology
"Ex Calling" (2016)	"Prblms" (2016)	"Bless Me" (2016)

Music video
- "PRBLMS" on YouTube

"Prblms" (a disemvoweling of "problems" and stylized in all caps) is a single by American singer 6lack. It was released on September 23, 2016, by LoveRenaissance and Interscope Records. The track was produced by NOVA. The song was certified 3× Platinum by the Recording Industry Association of America (RIAA) in December 2020. Following the popularity, 6lack would go on to open for The Weeknd.

== Background and release ==
6lack originally released "Prblms" onto SoundCloud on April 14, 2016. His manager connected with Apple Music's R&B curator, and eventually the song appeared on 10 playlists through the service. In June, media personality Kylie Jenner lip-synced to the song during one of her Snapchat videos, which boosted the popularity of it. 6lack said Jenner's shout-out was a great experience, and it showed him that he was "doing something right." The song was later re-released officially in September of that year.

Lyrically, the song is about a failing relationship. 6lack wrote the song after having a fight with the woman he was seeing at the time; one of the lines from the song is a text that he received from her the night he was writing the song.

== Music video ==
The music video for "Prblms" was released on October 14, 2016, on 6lack's Vevo account.

== Charts ==
=== Weekly charts ===
Chart (2017)	Peak position
US Billboard Hot 100	72
US Hot R&B/Hip-Hop Songs (Billboard)	34

=== Year-end charts ===
Chart (2017)	Position
US Hot R&B/Hip-Hop Songs (Billboard)	96

== Certifications ==
Region	Certification	Certified units/sales
Brazil (Pro-Música Brasil)	Gold	30,000^{‡}
Canada (Music Canada)	3× Platinum	240,000^{‡}
New Zealand (RMNZ)	Platinum	30,000^{‡}
United Kingdom (BPI)	Silver	200,000^{‡}
United States (RIAA)	4× Platinum	4,000,000^{‡}
^{‡} Sales+streaming figures based on certification alone.
