= East Atlanta Love Letter =

Studio album by 6lack
- Released: September 14, 2018
- Studio: The Post Office, Toronto, Ontario; No Excuses, Santa Monica, California; Butter Music + Sound, Venice, California; The Village, Los Angeles, California; Fireside Sound, Los Angeles, California; Perfect Sound, Los Angeles, California; LVRN, Atlanta, Georgia; OTR, Montreal, Quebec
- Genre: Alternative R&B; soul
- Length: 47:53
- Label: LVRN; Interscope
- Producer: Yakob; Bizness Boi; Stwo; Bobby Johnson; Cardiak; Daniel Cartisano; Dave Bayley; DJDS; Ekzakt; Fwdslxsh; Gravez; Harry Edwards; Joel Little; Lucian Blomkamp; Onlyxne; Pink Skies; Prep Bijan; T-Minus

6lack chronology
Free 6lack (2016)	East Atlanta Love Letter (2018)	6pc Hot EP (2020)

Singles from East Atlanta Love Letter
- 1. "Switch" Released: June 22, 2018; 2. "Nonchalant" Released: August 17, 2018; 3. "Pretty Little Fears" Released: October 15, 2018; 4. "Seasons" Released: August 9, 2019

East Atlanta Love Letter is the second studio album by American singer 6lack. It was released on September 14, 2018 by LVRN and Interscope Records. It is the follow-up to his 2016 release, Free 6lack. The production on the album was handled by multiple producers including T-Minus, Cardiak, Joel Little and Bizness Boi among others. The album also features guest appearances from Future, J. Cole, Offset and Khalid.

East Atlanta Love Letter was supported by three singles: "Switch", "Nonchalant" and "Pretty Little Fears". The album received positive reviews from music critics and was a commercial success. It debuted at number three on the US Billboard 200 chart, earning 77,000 album-equivalent units in its first week. The album was also certified gold by the Recording Industry Association of America (RIAA) in December 2020.

== Background and release ==
In June 2018, 6lack posted a picture on his social media saying "I think my album is done". While talking about the album in interview with Highsnobiety, 6lack said;

"Free 6lack was about everything I'd been through up to that point; the follow-up is an update on what's going on in my life right now. In two years, things have gone from one side of the spectrum to another. Anything I've had to go through, or learn, has been crammed into them: from being a dad, to [ending and starting] new relationships, to becoming famous and figuring out my responsibilities."

On August 13, 2018, he announced that it will be titled East Atlanta Love Letter". On August 29, he announced the album's release date and posted the artwork, which features him in a makeshift studio with his daughter, Syx Rose Valentine. On September 11, he shared the official track listing and released the album on September 14.

== Promotion ==
The lead single from the album, "Switch", was released on June 22, 2018. The music video for "Switch" was released on July 16, 2018. "Nonchalant" was released as the album's second single on August 17, 2018, with its accompanying music video. The third single, "Pretty Little Fears", was released on September 13, 2018, hours before the album was released. The fourth single, "Seasons", was released with a music video on August 9, 2019.

For further promotion of the album, 6lack started a tour in October 2018. He is joined by THEY., Boogie, Tierra Whack, Summer Walker, Deante' Hitchcock, and Ari Lennox.

== Critical reception ==
Professional ratings
Aggregate scores
Source	Rating
Metacritic	74/100
Review scores
Source	Rating
Exclaim!	7/10
HipHopDX	4.5/5
The Line of Best Fit	8/10
Pitchfork	6.1/10
Vice (Expert Witness)	A−

East Atlanta Love Letter received positive reviews from critics. At Metacritic, which assigns a normalized rating out of 100 to reviews from mainstream publications, the album received an average score of 74 based on 4 reviews. In a positive review, Kitty Richardson of The Line of Best Fit concluded 6lack "trumped his opponents and influences with a fragile grace and solid talent for songwriting, echoing that of our most decorated balladeers. It's a hope that the album's use of an undeniably fashionable sound doesn't hinder its potential for timelessness; there is so much here to fall for." Luke Fox of Exclaim! described East Atlanta Love Letter as "impeccably cohesive", praising the minimalist production and adding the album is "a record that captures the trap-soul zeitgeist that will best catch you in your feelings." Online hip hop publication HipHopDX praised the album, stating: "In an era where artists hype up projects that turn out to be nothing but half-baked playlists, 6LACK’s thoughtful embrace of the album format is refreshing. East Atlanta Love Letter is a moody masterpiece that may very well take the artist’s career to new heights."

In a mixed review, Dean Van Nguyen of Pitchfork criticised the album's lyrical content, commenting that 6lack "traps listeners within the four walls of his drab hotel room, exposing us to his joyless, low-energy meditations that don’t capture relationships or the human experience in any kind of meaningful way."

=== Year-end lists ===
Publication	Accolade	Rank	Ref.
Billboard	The 10 Best R&B Albums of 2018	6	
Capital XTRA	20 Best Albums of 2018	9	
Clash	The Best Albums of 2018	3	
Complex	The Best Albums of 2018	25	
HipHopDX	R&B Albums of the Year	2	
PopSugar	27 Best Albums of 2018	9	
Vibe	30 Best Albums of 2018	No order	

== Commercial performance ==
East Atlanta Love Letter debuted at number three on the US Billboard 200 chart, earning 77,000 album-equivalent units (including 20,000 copies as pure album sales) in its first week. This became 6lack's first US top-ten debut and his highest-charting release in the US to date. In its second week, the album dropped to number 12 on the chart, earning an additional 32,000 units. On December 10, 2020, the album was certified gold by the Recording Industry Association of America (RIAA) for combined sales and album-equivalent units of over 500,000 units in the United States.

== Track listing ==
East Atlanta Love Letter track listing
No.	Title	Writer(s)	Producer(s)	Length
1.	"Unfair"	Ricardo Valentine; Gavin DeGraw	Stwo	2:16
2.	"Loaded Gun"	Valentine; Andre Robertson; Carl McCormick	Bizness Boi; Cardiak	3:18
3.	"East Atlanta Love Letter" (featuring Future)	Valentine; Nayvadius Wilburn	Yakob	4:06
4.	"Let Her Go"	Valentine; Robertson; Zachary Perry; David Hughes	Bizness Boi; Ekzakt; Prep Bijan	2:57
5.	"Sorry"	Valentine	Fwdslxsh; Yakob; Pink Skies^{[a]}	3:30
6.	"Pretty Little Fears" (featuring J. Cole)	Valentine; Jermaine Cole; Jakob Rabitsch	T-Minus; Yakob^{[a]}	4:00
7.	"Disconnect"	Valentine	Yakob; Singawd; Edwards	4:25
8.	"Switch"	Valentine; Tyrone Griffin, Jr.	Joel Little	3:27
9.	"Thugger's Interlude"	Valentine	Bobby Johnson; Singawd^{[a]}; Yakob^{[a]}	1:11
10.	"Balenciaga Challenge" (featuring Offset)	Valentine; Kiari Cephus	Singawd; Onlyxne; Yakob	3:07
11.	"Scripture"	Valentine; Bankole-Ojo; Christopher Justice; Slade; Edwards	Fwdslxsh; Gravez; Singawd; Edwards; Cartisano	3:20
12.	"Nonchalant"	Valentine; Vidal	Stwo; Blomkamp^{[a]}	3:03
13.	"Seasons" (featuring Khalid)	Valentine; Khalid Robinson; Dave Bayley; Rabitsch	Dave Bayley; Singawd^{[a]}; Blomkamp^{[a]}; Yakob^{[a]}; Pink Skies^{[a]}	4:10
14.	"Stan"	Valentine; Kevin Drew; Kelly Zutrau	DJDS	5:03
Total length:				47:53

Notes

- ^{^[a]} signifies an additional producer
- "East Atlanta Love Letter" features uncredited background vocals by Mereba
- "Let Her Go" and "Sorry" features uncredited additional vocals by Tierra Whack
- "Disconnect" and "Balenciaga Challenge" features uncredited additional vocals by LightSkinKeisha
- "Switch" features background vocals by Ty Dolla Sign
- "Stan" features background vocals by Zalma Bour

Sample credits

- "Unfair" contains elements from "More Than Anyone", written by Gavin DeGraw and performed by Allyson Magno.
- "Stan" contains elements from "New Grave", written by Jerome Potter, Samuel Griesemer, Kevin Drew and Kelly Zutrau and performed by DJDS.

== Personnel ==
- Evan Miles – recording (track 1)
- JT Gagarin – recording (tracks 2, 4–7, 10–14)
- Yakob – recording (track 3)
- 6lack – recording (tracks 8, 9)
- Manny Marroquin – mixing (all tracks)
- Chris Galland – mixing engineer (all tracks)
- Robin Florent – mixing engineer (all tracks)
- Scott Desmarais – mixing engineer (all tracks)
- Emerson Mancini – mastering (all tracks)

== Charts ==
=== Weekly charts ===
Weekly chart performance for East Atlanta Love Letter
Chart (2018)	Peak position
Australian Albums (ARIA)	6
Austrian Albums (Ö3 Austria)	30
Belgian Albums (Ultratop Flanders)	21
Belgian Albums (Ultratop Wallonia)	63
Canadian Albums (Billboard)	5
Danish Albums (Hitlisten)	11
Dutch Albums (Album Top 100)	7
Finnish Albums (Suomen virallinen lista)	39
French Albums (SNEP)	74
German Albums (Offizielle Top 100)	44
Irish Albums (IRMA)	12
Italian Albums (FIMI)	95
New Zealand Albums (RMNZ)	15
Norwegian Albums (VG-lista)	6
Swedish Albums (Sverigetopplistan)	17
Swiss Albums (Schweizer Hitparade)	19
UK Albums (OCC)	19
US Billboard 200	3
US Top R&B/Hip-Hop Albums (Billboard)	2

=== Year-end charts ===
Year-end chart performance for East Atlanta Love Letter
Chart (2018)	Position
US Billboard 200	188
US Top R&B/Hip-Hop Albums (Billboard)	66

== Certifications ==
Certifications for East Atlanta Love Letter
Region	Certification	Certified units/sales
Canada (Music Canada)	Platinum	80,000^{‡}
Denmark (IFPI Danmark)	Gold	10,000^{‡}
United Kingdom (BPI)	Silver	60,000^{‡}
United States (RIAA)	Gold	500,000^{‡}
^{‡} Sales+streaming figures based on certification alone.
