= No Face (Drake song) =

Single by Drake

from the EP 100 Gigs
- Released: August 31, 2024
- Length: 2:17
- Label: OVO; Republic
- Composer: Aubrey Drake Graham

"No Face" is a song by Canadian rapper Drake released as a single on August 31, 2024.

The song was originally dropped on August 23, 2024 on Drake's Instagram burner account @plottttwistttttt featuring Playboi Carti. The song was officially released without Playboi Carti.

== Charts ==
Chart performance for "No Face"
Chart (2024)	Peak position
Canada Hot 100 (Billboard)	50
Global 200 (Billboard)	144
US Billboard Hot 100	60
US Hot R&B/Hip-Hop Songs (Billboard)	13

== Certifications ==
Certifications for "No Face"
Region	Certification	Certified units/sales
Brazil (Pro-Música Brasil)	Gold	20,000^{‡}
^{‡} Sales+streaming figures based on certification alone.
