= Since I Have a Lover =

Studio album by 6lack
- Released: March 24, 2023
- Genres: R&B; pop
- Length: 58:23
- Labels: LVRN; Interscope
- Producers: Aaron Bow; Adriano; apob; Camper; Cobalii; Dylan Wiggins; EY; ForTheNight; Fwdslxsh; Honeywood Six; Joe Reeves; Kill September; Khris Riddick; Marzi; Nick Veinoglou; Nik D; Olu; Oz; Psymun; Rex Kudo; Scribz Riley; Simon On The Moon; Singawd; Slimwav; Sounwave; Steve (Tave) Octave; Teddy Walton; Yakob

6lack chronology
6pc Hot EP (2020)	Since I Have a Lover (2023)	Love Is the New Gangsta (2026)

Alternative cover

Singles from Since I Have a Lover
- 1. "Rent Free" Released: December 17, 2021; 2. "Since I Have a Lover" Released: March 1, 2023; 3. "Talkback" Released: March 10, 2023; 4. "Fatal Attraction" Released: March 16, 2023

Since I Have a Lover is the third studio album by American singer 6lack. It was released on March 24, 2023, through LVRN and Interscope Records. The album received a nomination for Best Progressive R&B Album at the 66th Annual Grammy Awards.

== Background ==
On February 21, 2023, 6lack posted a video of a billboard announcing that his next album was releasing in March 2023 with the caption "and finally, we’re 6ack, March 2023 — #SIHAL 💐". On February 22, 6lack posted a video snippet for the lead single "Since I Have a Lover", announcing that an album of the same name would be released on March 24, 2023. The single released on March 1. On March 10, 6lack released the single "Talkback". On March 16, 6lack released the single "Fatal Attraction". The album was released on March 24.

6lack embarked on a world tour in support of the album, supported by Mereba, Jordan Ward, Quin, Spinall, and SadBoi. The tour began in October 2023 in Portland and concluded in March 2024 in Oslo.

== Critical reception ==
Professional ratings
Aggregate scores
Source	Rating
Metacritic	68/100
Review scores
Source	Rating
AllMusic	3.5/5 stars
Clash	8/10
The Line of Best Fit	7/10
The Observer	3/5 stars
Pitchfork	6.3/10

According to the review aggregator Metacritic, Since I Have a Lover received "generally favorable reviews" based on a weighted average score of 68 out of 100 from 6 critic scores.

Ammar Kalia of The Observer wrote that the album was "stifled by the weight of its slow and atmospheric fillers" describing it as "the work of an artist in transition, catering to old fans and well-trodden styles while attempting to settle on something new." The review for Pitchfork by Dylan Green concludes: "With mixed results, Lover tries to bring that eye and ear to a brighter musical palette and greener romantic pastures. To paraphrase the great Roy Kent, real love should make you feel like you’ve been struck by lightning. 6LACK manages some sparks here and there, but the tingles fade fast." AllMusic's Andy Kellman described the album as "breezy and uncharacteristically serene" and "lighter -- and more emotionally open -- than either of his first two LPs." Elliot Burr of The Line of Best Fit wrote that the album was "hiding thoughtful romanticisms and nuanced musical flashes that are a delight to discover." Writing for Clash, Robin Murray called the album 6lack's "crowning statement" with "some of his most personal work to date." Clayton Purdom of Rolling Stone wrote that the album paired "lines around the positive relationships in his life" with "music of characteristic richness".

The album received a nomination for Best Progressive R&B Album at the 66th Annual Grammy Awards.

== Track listing ==
Since I Have a Lover track listing
No.	Title	Writer(s)	Producer(s)	Length
1.	"Cold Feet"	Ricardo Valdez Valentine Jr.; Adeyinka Bankole; Jakob Rabitsch; Alex Gorchesky; Simon Hessman; Bianca Leonor Quiñones; Syx Rose Valentine	Fwdslxsh; Psymun; Yakob; Hessman	2:35
2.	"Inwood Hill Park"	Valentine; Bankole; Tobias Breuer; Tomi Mannonen; Octave	Fwdslxsh; Rascal; Steve (Tave) Octave; Kill September^{[a]}	3:09
3.	"Since I Have a Lover"	Ricardo Valentine; Bankole; Mark Anthony Spears; Dylan Wiggins	Fwdslxsh; Sounwave^{[a]}; Wiggins^{[a]}	4:42
4.	"Playin House"	Valentine; Bankole; James Francies; Mannonen; Abigail Smith; Trevor Slade; Wiggins	Fwdslxsh; Kill September; Singawd; Wiggins^{[a]}	3:33
5.	"Fatal Attraction"	Valentine; Bankole; Khristopher Riddick-Tynes; Wiggins	Fwdslxsh; Khris Riddick; Wiggins	3:16
6.	"Spirited Away"	Valentine; Bankole; London Cyr; Kaydence; Aaron Paul O'Brien; India Shawn	Fwdslxsh; London Cyr; apob^{[a]}	3:08
7.	"Chasing Feeling"	Valentine; Bankole; Alex Blake; EY; Marcus James; Kaydence; Mannonen; Wiggins	Fwdslxsh; EY; Wiggins^{[a]}; Kill September^{[a]}	1:40
8.	"Preach"	Valentine; Cobalii; Nik D; Oz	Cobalii; Nik D; Oz	2:36
9.	"Tit for Tat"	Valentine; Bankole; 8AE; Fashun; Honeywood Six; Marzi	Fwdslxsh; Marzi; Honeywood Six^{[a]}	2:13
10.	"Talkback"	Valentine; Michael Orabiyi; Jakob Rabitsch; Gordon Sumner	Scribz Riley; Nick Veinoglou; Yakob	3:04
11.	"Wunna Dem" (with Quin)	Valentine; Bankole; Quiñones; Kill September; Mannonen; Aaron Paris; Rabitsch	Fwdslxsh; Kill September	1:51
12.	"B4L"	Valentine; Adriano; ForTheNight	Adriano; ForTheNight	3:48
13.	"Decatur"	Valentine; Bankole; Kevin Ekofo; Alex Goldblatt; Olu Fann	Fwdslxsh; Olu	2:57
14.	"Talk"	Valentine; Aaron Booe; Travis Walton; Thurdi	Aaron Bow; Teddy Walton	3:30
15.	"Temporary" (featuring Don Toliver)	Valentine; Anastasiou Astrop; Bankole; Christian Beau; Rabitsch; Caleb Zackery Toliver	Fwdslxsh; Yakob^{[a]}	2:58
16.	"Rent Free"	Valentine; Bankole; Eyobed Getachew; Neil Aaron Huntley; Elias Knight; Kimberly Krysiuk; Leon Thomas; Rex Masamune Kudo	Fwdslxsh; Thomas; Rex Kudo; EY^{[r]}	3:22
17.	"Stories in Motion" (with Wale)	Valentine; Olubowale Victor Akintimehin; Bankole; Jerome Monroe Jr.	Fwdslxsh; Slimwav	3:22
18.	"Testify"	Valentine; Bankole; Hessman; Alexander Izquierdo; Stefan Johnson; Ilsey Juber; Joe Reeves; Kill September; Marcus Lomax; Singawd	Fwdslxsh; Reeves; Kill September^{[a]}; Hessman^{[a]}; Singawd^{[a]}	3:51
19.	"NRH"	Valentine; Bankole; Darhyl Camper Jr.; Jocelyn "Jozzy" Donald; Tyrone William Griffin, Jr.; Kill September; Singawd	Fwdslxsh; Camper; Kill September; Singawd	2:36
Total length:				58:23

Notes

- ^{^[a]} signifies an additional producer
- ^{^[r]} signifies a recording producer
- "Talkback" features an interpolation of "Shape of My Heart", as performed by Sting.

== Personnel ==
Musicians

- 6lack – vocals
- Quin – additional vocals (tracks 1, 3, 11)
- Syx Rose Valentine – additional vocals (1)
- Alex Gorchesky – guitar (1)
- Psymun – guitar (1)
- Yakob – guitar (1), string arrangement (11)
- Rascal – drum programming (2)
- Octave – guitar (2)
- Fwdslxsh – synthesizer (2, 7, 13), keyboard arrangements (2); drums, guitar (3); synthesizer (4, 15, 19), drum programming (5, 15, 17), programming (7, 13), string arrangement (11)
- Dylan Wiggins – bass guitar (3), synthesizer (4, 7)
- Alex Goldblatt – guitar (3, 13)
- Sounwave – programming (3)
- Singawd – drum programming (4), synthesizer (18, 19)
- Marco Bernardis – saxophone (4)
- Kill September – synthesizer (4, 18, 19)
- Khris Riddick – drum programming (5)
- India Shawn – additional vocals (6)
- EY – drum programming (7)
- Alex Blake – guitar (7)
- 8AE – additional vocals (9)
- Nick Veinoglou – guitar (10)
- Mereba – additional vocals (12, 19)
- Toian – additional vocals (12)
- ForTheNight – drum programming (12)
- Adriano – guitar (12), piano (12)
- Olu – drum programming (13)
- Kevin Ekofo – guitar (13)
- Syreeta Butler – spoken word (14)
- Beau Nox – background vocals (15)
- Leon Thomas – background vocals (15)
- Don Toliver – vocals (15)
- Slimwav – piano (17)
- Wale – vocals (17)
- Pink Sweats – additional vocals (18)
- Joe Reeves – bass guitar, guitar (18)
- Ashley Williams – choir (18)
- Erik Brooks – choir (18)
- Herman Bryant III – choir (18)
- Shelia Moser – choir (18)
- Steve Epting – choir (18)
- Simon Hessman – guitar (18)
- Crush – violin (18)
- Lauren Jauregui – additional vocals (19)
- Ty Dolla Sign – additional vocals (19)
- Camper – bass guitar, guitar (19)

Technical

- JT Gagarin – mixing
- Jon Castelli – mixing (1–15, 17–19)
- Joshua Deguzman – mix engineering (1–15, 17–19)
- Fwxdslxsh – recording arrangement (1, 2, 13, 15, 18)
- Simon Hessman – recording arrangement (1)
- Rascal – recording arrangement (2, 13)
- Derek "206derek" Anderson – recording (15)
- EY – recording production (16)

== Charts ==
Chart performance for Since I Have a Lover
Chart (2023)	Peak position
Canadian Albums (Billboard)	53
French Albums (SNEP)	152
Swiss Albums (Schweizer Hitparade)	48
US Billboard 200	24
US Top R&B/Hip-Hop Albums (Billboard)	7
