= Pretty Little Fears =

2018 single by 6lack featuring J. Cole

Single by 6lack featuring J. Cole

from the album East Atlanta Love Letter
- Released: September 13, 2018
- Genre: Alternative R&B
- Length: 4:00
- Label: LVRN; Interscope
- Songwriters: Ricardo Valentine; Jermaine Cole; Jakob Rabitsch
- Producers: T-Minus; Yakob

6lack singles chronology
"Nonchalant" (2018)	"Pretty Little Fears" (2018)	"If You Ever (Remix)" (2018)

J. Cole singles chronology
"Tribe" (2018)	"Pretty Little Fears" (2018)	"Sojourner" (2018)

Music video
- "Pretty Little Fears" on YouTube

"Pretty Little Fears" is a song by American singer 6lack, released on September 13, 2018, the third single from his second studio album East Atlanta Love Letter, which was released hours later on the same day. It features American rapper J. Cole and was produced by T-Minus and Yakob.

== Content ==
The song centers on the artists attempting to communicate effectively with their respective partners and also deals with the importance of being honest with one's significant other. 6lack opens the song confronting his girlfriend about their failed relationship, while J. Cole discusses how his relationship has allowed him to mature and be successful in life despite his past mistakes.

== Critical reception ==
Music critics have praised J. Cole's feature. Luke Fox of Exclaim! stated "J. Cole caps off the fragile 'Pretty Little Fears' with a smooth and smart personal verse." Daniel Spielberger of HipHopDX wrote that the song "proves why J. Cole is one of Hip Hop's most skilled lyricists with verses like: 'You plant a seed to grow some roots, a branch and leaves, Becomes a tree of life until our nights are filled, With peace from stress and strife, And that's the blessing that I get from wifing you.'"

== Music video ==
An official music video was directed by Matthew Dillon Cohen and premiered on October 15, 2018. It sees 6lack and J. Cole cruising the city and spending time with their respective ladies on a cloudy day in various places, such as a school gymnasium, beach, RV park and amusement park.

== Live performances ==
6lack performed the song on Jimmy Kimmel Live! on January 23, 2019.

== Charts ==
Chart (2018)	Peak position
Canada Hot 100 (Billboard)	65
New Zealand Hot Singles (RMNZ)	13
UK Singles (OCC)	86
US Billboard Hot 100	76
US Hot R&B/Hip-Hop Songs (Billboard)	35

== Certifications ==
Region	Certification	Certified units/sales
Canada (Music Canada)	2× Platinum	160,000^{‡}
New Zealand (RMNZ)	Platinum	30,000^{‡}
United Kingdom (BPI)	Silver	200,000^{‡}
United States (RIAA)	2× Platinum	2,000,000^{‡}
^{‡} Sales+streaming figures based on certification alone.
