= 6pc Hot EP =

EP by 6lack
- Released: June 26, 2020
- Length: 18:58
- Label: LVRN; Interscope
- Producer: Brody Brown; DJ Battlecat; Fwdslxsh; Gravez; Jack Ro; Joe Reeves; London Cyr; Nick Mira; Rance; Singawd; Stwo; Timbaland

6lack chronology
East Atlanta Love Letter (2018)	6pc Hot EP (2020)	Since I Have a Lover (2023)

Singles from 6pc Hot EP
- 1. "ATL Freestyle" Released: May 28, 2020; 2. "Float" Released: June 24, 2020; 3. "Know My Rights" Released: June 26, 2020

6pc Hot EP is the first extended play by American singer 6lack. It was released on June 26, 2020, through LVRN and Interscope Records. Production was handled by twelve record producers, including DJ Battlecat, Nick Mira, Stwo, Timbaland, Canadian producer London Cyr, and British producer Fwdslxsh, the latter two of whom executive-produced the EP. It features a sole guest appearance from rapper Lil Baby on the single "Know My Rights".

== Background ==
In May 2020, 6lack released the track "ATL Freestyle", initially as a free track. On June 24, 2020, he celebrated his birthday with the release of the single "Float". The same day, after holding back on releasing new music in honor of George Floyd, and in solidarity with protests against police brutality, he announced the release of 6pc Hot.

== Critical reception ==
Professional ratings
Aggregate scores
Source	Rating
Metacritic	77/100
Review scores
Source	Rating
AllMusic	3.5/5 stars
Clash	7/10
HipHopDX	3.7/5
NME	4/5 stars
Pitchfork	7.5/10
Tom Hull	B+

6pc Hot EP was met with positive reviews from music critics. At Metacritic, which assigns a normalized rating out of 100 to reviews from mainstream publications, the EP received an average score of 77, based on five reviews.

Reviewing for AllMusic, Andy Kellman wrote, "Despite its intermediary status, [the EP's] material comes across as deeply considered and hints at creative growth, with the singer/rapper even more persuasive with heartfelt sentiments despite being as understated as ever." Robin Murray of Clash Magazine deemed the record "a succinct but potent new EP", writing, "6PC Hot is a suggestive, highly creative return, one that suggests fresh possibilities while further reinforcing [6lack's] future-charged brand of arena level R&B." Mimi Kenny of HipHopDX praised the album's vocals and production, writing, "6LACK succeeds at creating a sound that's got a personality beyond the moody, even if he's unlikely to be donning parachute pants or an ice cream cone face tat anytime soon." Will Lavin of NME applauded the album's instrumentation and 6lack's vocal performances, writing, "There's a new crooner ready to take his place in the pantheon of modern giants, and this six-track record is a delicious taste of things to come." Writing for Pitchfork, Evan Rytlewski wrote, "6lack's great instinct is knowing when to do a little less, and on 6pc Hot it pays off sublimely. He no longer sounds like a replacement-level R&B singer. He's starting to sound like a master."

== Track listing ==
No.	Title	Writer(s)	Producer(s)	Length
1.	"ATL Freestyle"	Ricardo Valdez Valentine Jr.; Adeyinka Bankole; Christopher Justice	Fwdslxsh; Gravez	3:24
2.	"Long Nights"	Valentine Jr.; Steven Vidal	Stwo	2:36
3.	"Float"	Valentine Jr.; Bankole; Jack Rochon; Nick Mira; Trevor Slade; Anthony Clemons Jr.	Fwdslxsh; Jack Ro; Nick Mira; Singawd	3:00
4.	"Know My Rights" (featuring Lil Baby)	Valentine Jr.; Dominique Jones; Bankole; Slade; James Cyr; Joseph Reeves	Fwdslxsh; Joe Reeves; London Cyr; Singawd	3:14
5.	"Elephant in the Room"	Valentine Jr.; Timothy Zachery Mosley	Brody Brown; DJ Battlecat; Rance; Timbaland	3:34
6.	"Outside"	Valentine Jr.; Bankole; Slade	Fwdslxsh; Singawd	3:10
Total length:				18:58

== Personnel ==
- Ricardo Valdez Valentine Jr. – vocals
- Dominique Jones – vocals (track 4)
- ELHAE – additional vocals (track 1)
- Courtney Shanade Salter – additional vocals (track 2)
- Malik "Venna" Venner – saxophone (track 2)
- Maschine – drums (track 4)
- Adeyinka "Fwdslxsh" Bankole – producer (tracks: 1, 3, 4, 6)
- Christopher "Gravez" Justice – producer (track 1)
- Steven "Stwo" Vidal – producer (track 2)
- Trevor "Singawd" Slade – producer (tracks: 3, 4, 6)
- Jack Rochon – producer (track 3)
- Nicholas Warren Mira – producer (track 3)
- Joseph Reeves – guitar and producer (track 4)
- James Cyr – producer (track 4)
- Timothy Zachery Mosley – producer (track 5)
- Kevin Gilliam – producer (track 5)
- Brody Brown – producer (track 5)
- Rance – producer (track 5)
- Jared "JT" Gagarin – mixing and recording (tracks: 1–4, 6)
- Matthew Robinson – recording (track 4)
- Manny Marroquin – mixing (track 5)
- Chris Galland – mixing (track 5)
- Robin Florent – assistant mixing (track 5)
- Scott Desmarais – assistant mixing (track 5)
- Dylan Del-Olmo – recording (track 5)
- Lorenzo Cardona – recording (track 5)
- Elton "L10MixedIt" Chueng – mastering

== Charts ==
Chart (2020)	Peak position
Australian Urban Albums (ARIA)	25
Belgian Albums (Ultratop Flanders)	170
Canadian Albums (Billboard)	50
French Albums (SNEP)	190
UK R&B Albums (OCC)	37
US Billboard 200	15
