= Quiñ =

American singer

Quinoia
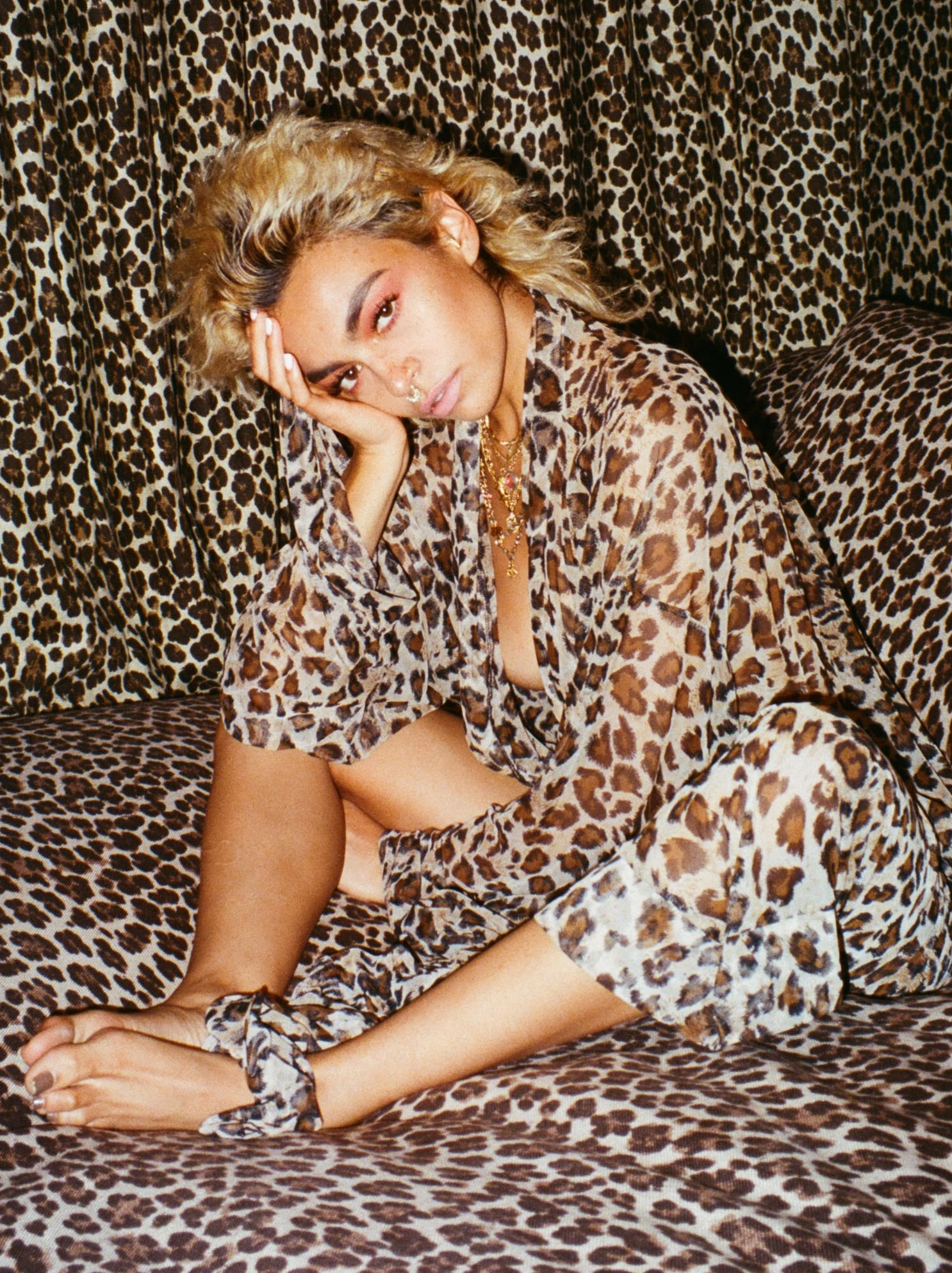
- Quiñ in 2017

Background information
- Also known as: Quiñ
- Born: Bianca Leonor Quiñones Los Angeles, California, U.S.
- Occupations: Producer; singer; songwriter
- Years active: 2013–present
- Label: Interscope

Bianca Leonor Quiñones, known professionally as Quiñ, is an American singer, songwriter, and record producer from Los Angeles. She is signed to Interscope Records and Fantasy Soul.

== Early life and education ==
Bianca Leonor Quiñones was born in Los Angeles, California, United States of Puerto Rican and Mexican descent. She was exposed to music and performance from an early age. Quiñones grew up in a musical household, where her father played the conga drums and trumpet, while her mother worked as a dancer and school teacher. During her childhood, she participated in church and high school choirs, which contributed to her early vocal development.

According to her mother, Quiñones wrote her first song at a young age following the birth of her sister.

She attended school in Pasadena, California. After graduating from Pasadena High School, she moved on to college at Cal State Northridge. After a year and a half of studying psychology, Quiñones moved to West Oakland and began focusing on music full time at age 19.

== Career ==
Quiñ released her debut EP, Galactica, in October 2016, which includes a feature from G-Eazy on the song "Over Again". She describes the EP as “the first chapter to my Fantasy Soul Universe.” Her song "Lightspeed" was involved in the Visions of Harmony project led by Apple Music and NASA, which aimed to educate the public on the Juno spacecraft by combining science and art.

A year later, in September 2017, Quiñ released her Dreamgirl EP, a sequel of her album Galactica. The EP featured collaborations with Syd on the song “Sticky Situation," and Buddy on the song "Happened to Happen". A music video for “Sticky Situation” was released in August 2017.

She describes her sound as "fantasy soul" and music that "has the power of versatility". In 2017, Quiñ introduced her label, Fantasy Soul, named after the genre.

In August 2018, she released "Remind Me" as a single, described by The Fader as “daydream-inducing antidote for all life's worries.” Later that year, she collaborated with Vans for a campaign highlighting the importance of creativity and personal style.

In June 2019, she signed to Interscope Records. She released her fourth EP Lucid in November, which featured 6lack.

Quiñ has opened for Erykah Badu, Gnash, JMSN, and performed at The Fader Fort at SXSW, Afropunk Festival and Galore's Girl Cult Festival.

On April 20, 2020, musician Lisa released a choreography video to Quiñ's "Mushroom Chocolate".

She was featured on the Khalid song "Brand New" from his Scenic Drive mixtape which released in December 2021.

== Discography ==
=== Albums ===
- Galactica (2016)

=== Extended plays ===
- Dreamgirl (2017)
- Lucid (2019)
