= 6lack =

American singer (born 1992)

6LACK
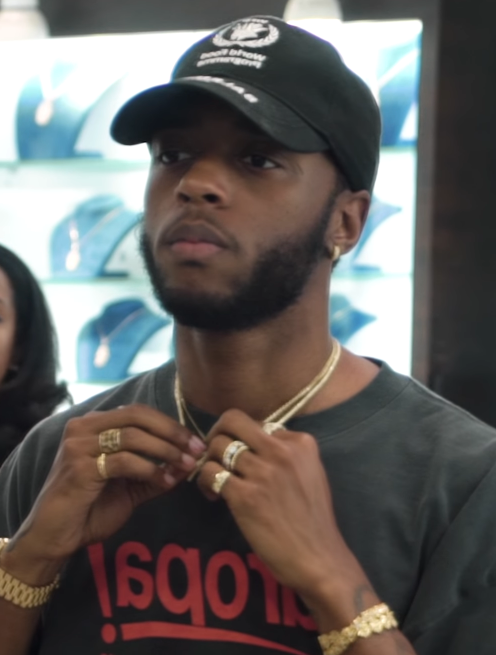
- 6LACK in 2018

Background information
- Born: Ricardo Valdez Valentine Jr. June 24, 1992 (age 34); Baltimore, Maryland, U.S.
- Origin: Atlanta, Georgia, U.S.
- Genres: Alternative R&B; R&B; trap
- Occupations: Singer; songwriter; rapper
- Works: Discography
- Years active: 2011–present
- Labels: Love Renaissance; Interscope
- Member of: Spillage Village
- Website: 6lack.com

Ricardo Valdez Valentine Jr. (born June 24, 1992), known professionally as 6lack (stylized as 6LACK, pronounced "black"), is an American R&B singer, songwriter and rapper. Born in Baltimore, Maryland, and raised in Atlanta, Georgia, he gained recognition following the release of his 2016 single "Prblms", which marked his first entry on the Billboard Hot 100. He signed with Love Renaissance, an imprint of Interscope Records to release his debut studio album, Free 6lack (2016), which was nominated for Best Urban Contemporary Album at the 60th Annual Grammy Awards and received platinum certification by the Recording Industry Association of America (RIAA).

Released two years later, his second studio album, East Atlanta Love Letter (2018), peaked at number three on the Billboard 200, while his single "OTW" (with Khalid and Ty Dolla Sign), received double platinum certification by the Recording Industry Association of America (RIAA). His debut extended play (EP) 6pc Hot (2020), included the single "Know My Rights" (featuring Lil Baby). Later that year, he guest performed alongside Elton John on Gorillaz's single "The Pink Phantom". His 2021 single, "Calling My Phone" (featuring Lil Tjay), peaked at number three on the Billboard Hot 100 and peaked atop the Canadian Hot 100; it remains his highest-charting song on the former chart. His third album, Since I Have a Lover (2023), was met with moderate critical and commercial reception.

6lack joined the Atlanta-Baltimore musical collective Spillage Village—founded by EarthGang and JID—in 2014. He has received five Grammy Award nominations.

== Early life ==
Ricardo Valdez Valentine Jr. was born on June 24, 1992, in Baltimore, Maryland, and moved to Atlanta, Georgia, with his parents in 1997. He attended Stone Mountain High School and Newton High School. He is the eldest of three siblings. Valentine's first recording experience was at 4 years of age, at his father's studio. He began rapping in middle school as a battle rapper and was involved in many freestyle battles in his youth including against rapper Young Thug.

== Career ==
=== 2011–2017: Beginnings and Free 6lack ===
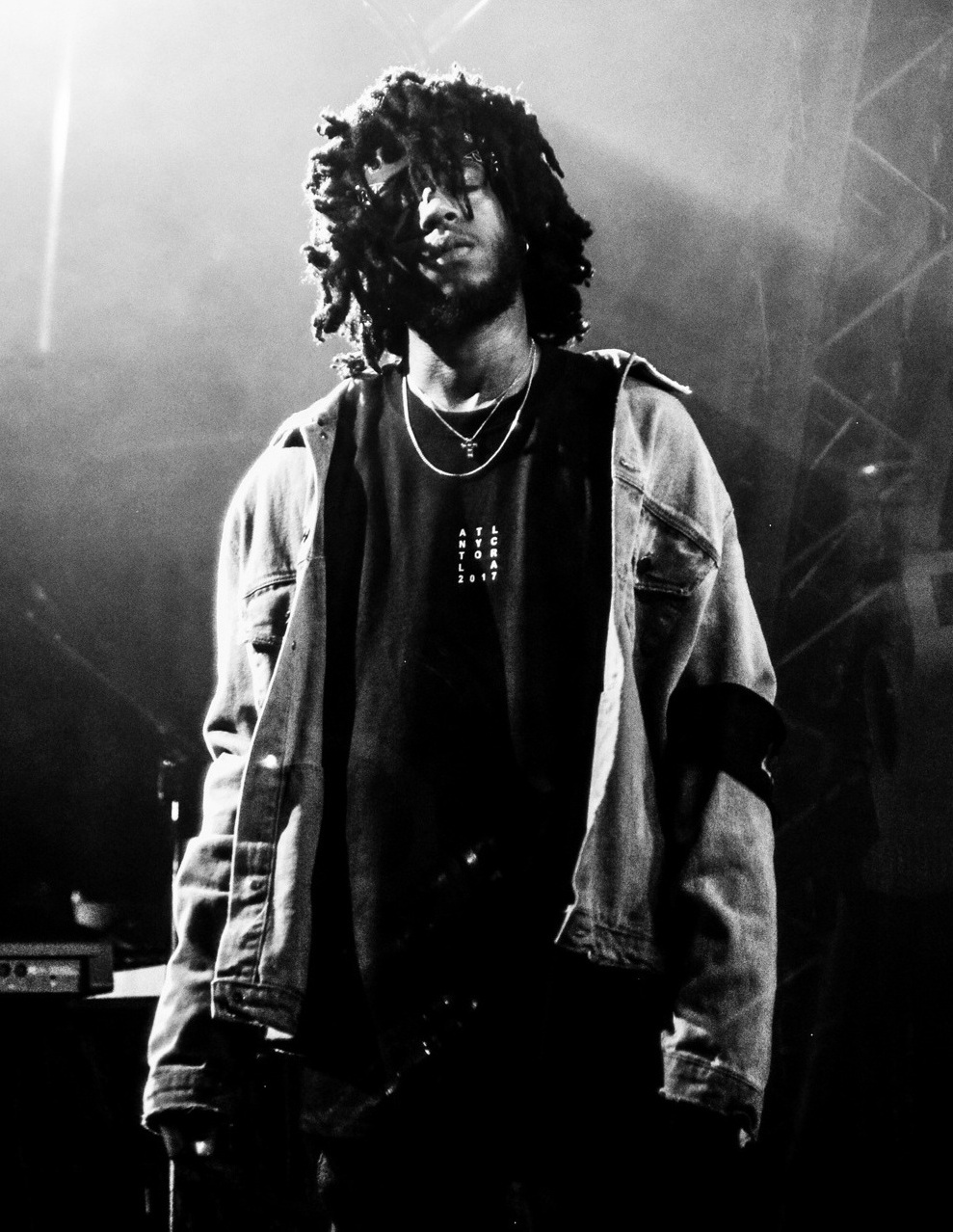
6lack in January 2017

6lack signed a record deal with Flo Rida's International Music Group and Strong Arm Records in July 2011. He left Valdosta State University once he signed, and spent the next few years learning about the industry. 6lack spent five years with the label, putting music out on his SoundCloud account. 6lack had little financial security and spent most of his time sleeping in the studio or outside on the street after moving to Miami, Florida to work on music with the record label. 6lack eventually left his label due to issues over artistic and creative license and management. In 2015, 6lack announced that he had joined the musical collective Spillage Village after living with the members of EarthGang, and appeared on four tracks of Spillage Village mixtape called Bears Like This Too in 2015.

Once he left the label, he signed with Love Renaissance and Interscope Records. In November 2016, Rolling Stone included 6lack in their list of "10 New Artists You Need to Know". He then went on to release his debut studio album, Free 6lack, which peaked at number 34 on the Billboard 200 chart. The album's single "Prblms" peaked at number 73 on the Billboard Hot 100 chart and became his first platinum record. In April 2017, he joined Canadian singer The Weeknd as opening act for his Legend of the Fall tour in North America.

=== 2018–present: East Atlanta Love Letter, 6pc Hot, and Since I Have a Lover ===
In 2018, he opened for Chris Brown's "Heartbreak on a Full Moon Tour". In April 2018, he released the single "OTW" with Khalid and Ty Dolla Sign, which has reached at number 57 on the Billboard Hot 100. "OTW" became 6lack's highest peaking song on the Hot 100. The first single for his sophomore album, "Switch", was released on June 22, 2018, with a music video released on July 16. "Nonchalant" was released as the album's second single on August 17, with its accompanying music video. On September 14, 2018, 6lack released his second studio album, East Atlanta Love Letter, featuring guest appearances from Future, J. Cole, Offset, and Khalid. The album's release was preceded by the singles "Switch" and "Nonchalant." In October 2018, 6lack started a tour for the promotion of the album, with opening acts THEY., Tierra Whack, Boogie, Deante' Hitchcock, Summer Walker, and Ari Lennox. 6lack later featured on several other songs, such as "Waves" by Normani. and "Crowded Room" by Selena Gomez, in 2019 and early 2020, respectively.

In May 2020, 6lack released the track "ATL Freestyle". A few weeks later, on June 24, 2020, 6lack celebrated his birthday with the release of the single "Float". He also announced his EP 6pc Hot, which was released on June 26 and included the Lil Baby-assisted single, "Know My Rights". He also launched his own hot sauce brand 600 Degrees Original. 6lack appeared on two tracks from Spillage Village's Spilligion album, released in September 2020. During 2020, he collaborated with British virtual band Gorillaz and singer-songwriter Elton John on the track "The Pink Phantom", for the band's seventh studio album, Song Machine, Season One: Strange Timez, and with rappers Lil Durk and Young Thug for the song "Stay Down" from the former's sixth studio album, The Voice. The song peaked at number 74 on the Billboard Hot 100.

In 2021, he released "Calling My Phone" with Bronx rapper Lil Tjay. In 2022, he was featured on Canadian singer-songwriter Jessie Reyez's album Yessie, in her song "Forever", and its accompanying music video.

On March 24, 2023, 6lack released his album Since I Have a Lover. The 19-track album featured the artists QUIN, Wale, and Don Toliver, and was also nominated for Best Progressive R&B Album at the Grammys. In an interview with Complex, 6lack stated that the title responds to questions such as "Where have you been? What have you been doing? What's the inspiration?" that people asked him. On March 22, 2024, 6lack released his acoustic project No More Lonely Nights. It featured 6 songs off his album Since I Have a Lover.

== Artistry ==
6lack's music focuses or is based on personal and business relationships frequently, especially the topic of heartbreak. 6lack has said that his songwriting is influenced mainly by his personal experiences and failed relationships. Billboard magazine has described 6lack's music as "moody hip hop" that "spotlights vulnerability and honesty in a way the emoji generation can understand." 6lack has cited Sade, T-Pain, The-Dream, and Usher as his influences.

== Personal life ==
6lack has two daughters, born in 2017 and 2025.

== Discography ==
- Free 6lack (2016)
- East Atlanta Love Letter (2018)
- Since I Have a Lover (2023)
- Love Is the New Gangsta (2026)

== Tours ==
Headlining

- Free 6lack Tour (2017)
- From East Atlanta with Love Tour (2018)
- Since I Have a Lover Tour (2023)

Supporting

- Starboy: Legend of the Fall Tour (with The Weeknd) (2017)
- Heartbreak on a Full Moon Tour (with Chris Brown) (2018)
- It Was You All Along Tour (with Russ) (2024)

== Awards and nominations ==
Year	Awards	Category	Nominee / work	Result
2017	Soul Train Music Awards	Best New Artist	Himself	Nominated
2018	Grammy Awards	Best Urban Contemporary Album	Free 6lack	Nominated
2018	Grammy Awards	Best Rap/Sung Performance	"Prblms"	Nominated
2018	iHeartRadio Music Awards	Best New R&B Artist	Himself	Nominated
2018	Soul Train Music Awards	Best Collaboration	"OTW" (with Khalid and Ty Dolla Sign)	Nominated
2019	Grammy Awards	Best Rap/Sung Performance	"Pretty Little Fears" (with J. Cole)	Nominated
2019	MTV Video Music Award	Best R&B Video	"Waves" (with Normani)	Won
2024	Grammy Awards	Best Progressive R&B Album	Since I Have a Lover	Nominated
2026	Grammy Awards	Best Melodic Rap Performance	"Wholeheartedly" (with JID and Ty Dolla Sign)	Nominated
